= Saaletal =

Former Verwaltungsgemeinschaft in Germany

Coordinates: 51°15′36″N 12°01′52″E

Saaletal ("Saale valley") is a former Verwaltungsgemeinschaft ("collective municipality") in the district Burgenlandkreis in Saxony-Anhalt, Germany. It was situated north of Weißenfels. The seat of the Verwaltungsgemeinschaft was in Großkorbetha. It was disbanded in September 2010.

The Verwaltungsgemeinschaft Saaletal consisted of the following municipalities:

1. Burgwerben
2. Großkorbetha
3. Reichardtswerben
4. Schkortleben
5. Storkau
6. Tagewerben
7. Uichteritz
8. Wengelsdorf
