= Weißenfelser Land =

Municipality in Saxony-Anhalt, Germany

Coordinates: 51.200°N 11.967°E

Weißenfelser Land is a former Verwaltungsgemeinschaft ("collective municipality") in the Burgenlandkreis (district), in Saxony-Anhalt, Germany. The seat of the Verwaltungsgemeinschaft was in Weißenfels. It was disbanded in September 2010.

== Municipalities ==
The Verwaltungsgemeinschaft Weißenfelser Land consisted of the following municipalities:

1. Leißling
2. Weißenfels
