= Uichteritz =

- Stadtteil of Weißenfels
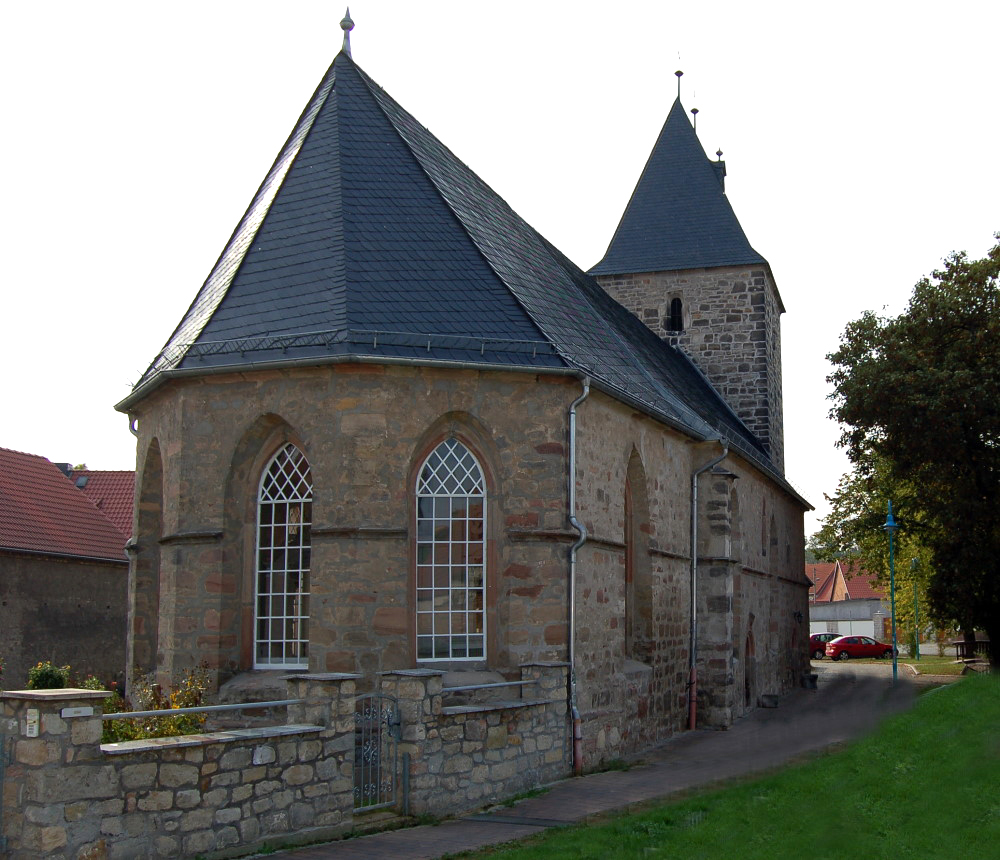
- Church in Uichteritz
- Interactive map of Uichteritz
- Location within Germany Location within Saxony-Anhalt
- Coordinates: 51°12′26″N 11°55′25″E
- Country: Germany
- State: Saxony-Anhalt
- District: Burgenlandkreis
- Town: Weißenfels

Area
  - Total: 8.55 km^{2} (3.30 sq mi)
- Elevation: 100 m (330 ft)

Population (2006-12-31)
  - Total: 1,417
  - Density: 166/km^{2} (429/sq mi)
- Time zone: UTC+01:00 (CET)
  - Summer (DST): UTC+02:00 (CEST)
- Postal codes: 06667
- Dialling codes: 03443
- Vehicle registration: BLK

Uichteritz German pronunciation: [ˈʏçtəʁɪt͡s] is a village and a former municipality in the Burgenlandkreis district, in Saxony-Anhalt, Germany. Since 1 January 2010, it is part of the town Weißenfels.

== Geography ==
Uichteritz is located between Goseck and Weißenfels north west of the Saale in the Saale valley, about 2.5 miles from Weißenfels.

Lobitzch also belonged to the old administrative district before it was annexed by Weißenfels.

=== Type of Settlement ===
Uichteritz has a settlement type known as Haufendorf. The village predominantly consists of one- and two-story houses which appear not to have been built in a particular planned way. Medium-sized courtyards, well-preserved half-timbered buildings as well as newly constructed one-and two-family houses dot the village.

== History ==
Uichteritz may have come into existence at the time of the Migration Period in the 6th or 7th Century. It was primarily Sorbs who settled in this region as evidenced by archeological finds, as well as placenames with the ending "-itz". The first documented mention of the village (as Uchteritz) was in the register of a monastery in Weißenfels. ird (Original im Domstift zu Merseburg).

Around 1300 the area was ruled by the Margrave of Meißen. Around this time the church in Uichteritz was constructed, now the oldest building in the village. At the back of the church there are sandstone pillars in which there are long troughs, so-call sword chutes. These were used by knights to dedicate their swords before going into battle.

The Saale broke its banks in 1784 and flooded the village, collapsing 44 houses, sheds and stables.

On 1 January 2010 the previously independent villages of Uichteritz, Markwerben and Langendorf were annexed by Weißenfels.

== Notable people ==
- Erdmann Neumeister (1671−1756), Religious lyricist and theologist in Hamburg.

== Literature ==
- August Nebe: Uichtritz, Zur Geschichte eines Dörfleins in der Zeit des dreißigjährigen Krieges, in: Neue Mitteilungen aus dem Gebiete historisch-antiquarischer Forschungen, 1874, S. 314ff (Uichteritz, the history of a small village during the thirty-year war)
