= Expedition Robinson (Central Europe) =

- Created by: Charlie Parsons
- Theme music composer: Andreas Nordqvist
- Countries of origin: Austria (2000); Germany
- Original language: German
- No. of seasons: 2

Original release
- Network: ORF (2000); RTL2
- Release: September 17, 2000 – 2001

Related
- Survivor franchise

Expedition Robinson is the Central European version of Expedition Robinson. The name alludes to both Robinson Crusoe and The Swiss Family Robinson, two stories featuring people marooned by shipwrecks.

== Background and history ==
In the spring of 2000, ORF in Austria and RTL2 in Germany decided to buy the broadcasting rights to the shows Big Brother and Expedition Robinson, as they wanted to begin airing a new "reality soaps" genre. Neither show was quite as big a success as RTL2 had expected, however both were renewed for a second season (Big Brother would eventually be renewed for at least ten more). Das Inselduell – Nur einer kommt durch! (English: The Island Duel – Only one survives!), an unofficial adaptation of the format aired on Sat.1 in 2000, but was axed after one season.

Following the first season, ORF chose to no longer broadcast Expedition Robinson leaving only RTL2 to air a second season. In 2001, RTL2 decided to produce a show that was almost identical to Expedition Robinson known as Gestrandet – Zeig, was in dir steckt! (Stranded – Show what you're made of!). Gestrandet proved to be a ratings failure and was also axed. This was followed by Outback, an unofficial adaptation of Survivor: The Australian Outback, in 2002 on RTL and a ProSieben revival of Survivor in 2007. The format returned once more in 2019, this time on VOX.

In October 2024, a further revival was announced by Banijay Entertainment to be produced in partnership by Turkish media company Acun Medya and Banijay subsidiary Brainpool TV for broadcast on Sport1. Filmed in the Dominican Republic, it is expected to begin airing in March 2026 with Detlef Soost as host.

== Format ==
The Robinson format was developed by Planet 24, a United Kingdom TV production company owned by Charlie Parsons and Bob Geldof. Their company Castaway Television Productions retained the rights to the concept when they sold Planet 24 in 1999. Mark Burnett later licensed the format to create the U.S. show Survivor in 2000.

Sixteen contestants are put into a survival situation and compete in a variety of physical challenges. Early in each season two teams compete but later on the teams are merged and the competitions become individual. At the end of each show one contestant is eliminated from the show by the others in a secret "island council" ballot.

The format for Gestrandet was very similar to that of Robinson, but instead of there being sixteen contestants, there were only fourteen and they were initially divided into tribes by gender. Jokers could also enter the game at any time. Finally the winner of Gestrandet was not determined by any kind of juror vote, but was decided by a large obstacle course.

== Seasons ==
| Year | Channel | Host | Location | Days | Participants | Winner |
|---|---|---|---|---|---|---|
| 2000 | ORF 1 (2000); RTL2 | Volker Piesczek | Malaysia | 39 | 19 | Melanie Lauer |
| 2001 | ORF 1 (2000); RTL2 | Pierre Geisensetter | Panama | 60 | 22 | Alexander Kolo |
| 2007 | Prosieben | Sascha Kalupke | Malaysia | 50 | 18 | Volker Kreuzner |
| 2019 | VOX | Florian Weber | Fiji | 39 | 18 | Lara Grünfeld |
| 2026 | Sport1 | Detlef Soost | Dominican Republic | 50 | 25 | Larissa Elena Renz |
Unofficial versions
| 2000 | Sat.1 | Holger Speckhahn | Malaysia | 50 | 14 | Michael |
| 2002 | RTL | Markus Lanz | Australia | 40 | 13 | Sergej Schmidt |
