= Leichtgesinnte Flattergeister, BWV 181 =

1724 church cantata by Johann Sebastian Bach

Leichtgesinnte Flattergeister
- BWV 181
- Church cantata by J. S. Bach
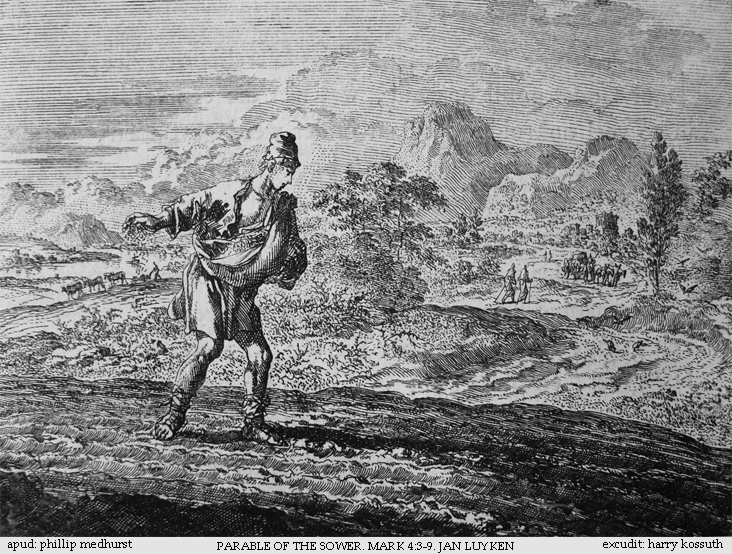
- Parable of the Sower, topic of the cantata, etching by Jan Luyken
- Occasion: Sexagesima
- Performed: 13 February 1724: Leipzig
- Movements: 5
- Vocal: SATB solo and choir
- Instrumental: trumpet; flauto traverso; oboe; 2 violins; viola; continuo

Leichtgesinnte Flattergeister (Light-minded frivolous spirits), BWV 181, is a church cantata by Johann Sebastian Bach. He composed it in Leipzig for Sexagesima and first performed it on 13 February 1724.

== History and words ==
Bach composed the cantata in his first year in Leipzig for the second Sunday before Lent, called Sexagesima. He had already composed a cantata for the occasion for the court in Eisenach, Gleichwie der Regen und Schnee vom Himmel fällt, BWV 18. It seems possible that in 1724 both works were performed in the service, one before, one after the sermon. The prescribed readings for the Sunday were taken from the Second Epistle to the Corinthians, "God's power is mighty in the weak" (2 Corinthians 11:19–12:9), and from the Gospel of Luke, the parable of the Sower (Luke 8:4–15).

The cantata text by an unknown poet stays close to the Gospel. The obstacles to growth of the seeds, such as rock and thorns, are related to other Biblical quotations where they are mentioned. For example, rock appears also when Moses gets water from a rock (Exodus 17:6) and a rock is removed from the grave of Jesus (Matthew 28:2). The cantata is not closed by a chorale but the only choral movement, a prayer that God's word may fall on fertile ground in us. The original anonymous libretto is extant.

Bach first performed the cantata on 13 February 1724. He performed it at least one more time between 1743 and 1746, only then he added parts for two woodwinds.

== Scoring and structure ==
The cantata in five movements is scored for four vocal soloists (soprano, alto, tenor, bass), a four-part choir, trumpet, flauto traverso, oboe, two violins, viola, and basso continuo.

1. Aria (bass): Leichtgesinnte Flattergeister
2. Recitative (alto): O unglückselger Stand verkehrter Seelen
3. Aria (tenor): Der schädlichen Dornen unendliche Zahl
4. Recitative (soprano): Von diesen wird die Kraft erstickt
5. Chorus: Laß, Höchster, uns zu allen Zeiten

== Music ==
The cantata consists of five movements: two aria/ recitative pairs, concluding with a choral movement. This resembles the typical format for secular cantatas. Likely at least the final movement if not others also are parodies of unknown secular music. The parts for flute and oboe were added for a later performance. A characteristic motif with staccato leaps dominates the movement, introduced by the instruments, then picked up by the voice. "Flattergeister" literally means "fluttering spirits". Richard Stokes translates the cantata title as "frivolous flibbertigibbets"; they compare to the fowl feeding on the seeds in "nervous, jerky movement". According to the musicologist Julian Mincham, it depicts the "flippant and superficial" in an irregular pattern, which fits an observation in Bach's obituary about his melodies, considered "strange and like no other's". Mincham continues: "One can never quite predict the turns which this spiky, disjointed melody is likely to take". A second part speaks of Belial, whose evil intervention is mentioned frequently in literature, including Milton's Paradise Lost. Both parts of the aria are repeated; after only four measures of what seems like a da capo, a modified version of the middle section begins which depicts Belial, the "demon of lies and guilt". The following secco recitative stresses the text "Es werden Felsenherzen … ihr eigen Heil verscherzen" (One day those hearts, so stony, … will their salvation forfeit) in an arioso. The images of the crumbling rocks are illustrated by a rugged line in the continuo. The tenor aria is probably lacking the part of an obbligato violin. Robert Levin supplied three "convincing reconstructions" for the Bach Cantata Pilgrimage. The final movement, with trumpet sound, is happy and uncomplicated. According to Christoph Wolff, the movement is based on a lost secular piece composed in Cöthen. Its middle section is a duet of soprano and alto. John Eliot Gardiner notes the movement's "madrigalian lightness and delicacy perfectly appropriate to the joyous message of the parable".

== Recordings ==
- Die Bach Kantate Vol. 27, Helmuth Rilling, Gächinger Kantorei, Bach-Collegium Stuttgart, Arleen Augér, Gabriele Schnaut (No.2), Gabriele Schreckenbach, Kurt Equiluz, Niklaus Tüller, Hänssler 1982
- J. S. Bach: Das Kantatenwerk – Sacred Cantatas Vol. 9, Gustav Leonhardt, Knabenchor Hannover, Collegium Vocale Gent, Leonhardt-Consort, soloist of the Knabenchor Hannover, Paul Esswood, Kurt Equiluz, Max van Egmond, Teldec 1988
- J. S. Bach: Complete Cantatas Vol. 7, Ton Koopman, Amsterdam Baroque Orchestra & Choir, Lisa Larsson, Elisabeth von Magnus, Gerd Türk, Klaus Mertens, Antoine Marchand 1997
- Bach Edition Vol. 5 – Cantatas Vol. 2, Pieter Jan Leusink, Holland Boys Choir, Netherlands Bach Collegium, Marjon Strijk, Sytse Buwalda, Nico van der Meel, Bas Ramselaar, Brilliant Classics 1999
- Bach Cantatas Vol. 20: Naarden / Southwell / For Septuagesima / For Sexagesima, John Eliot Gardiner, Monteverdi Choir, English Baroque Soloists, Angharad Gruffydd Jones, Robin Tyson, James Gilchrist, Stephan Loges, Archiv Produktion 2000
- J. S. Bach: Cantatas Vol. 17 – Cantatas from Leipzig 1724, Masaaki Suzuki, Bach Collegium Japan, Yukari Nonoshita, Robin Blaze, Gerd Türk, Peter Kooy, BIS 2001

== Sources ==
- Leichtgesinnte Flattergeister, BWV 181: Scores at the International Music Score Library Project
- Leichtgesinnte Flattergeister (cantata) BWV 181; BC A 45 / Sacred cantata (Sexagesima) Bach Digital
- Cantata BWV 181 Leichtgesinnte Flattergeister history, scoring, sources for text and music, translations to various languages, discography, discussion, Bach Cantatas Website
- BWV 181 Leichtgesinnte Flattergeister English translation, University of Vermont
- BWV 181 Leichtgesinnte Flattergeister text, scoring, University of Alberta
