= Survivor (German TV series) season 3 =

Survivor
- Season 3
- Presented by: Detlef Soost
- No. of days: 49
- No. of castaways: 25
- Winner: Larissa Elena Renz
- Runner-up: Jun Kim
- Location: La Altagracia, Dominican Republic
- No. of episodes: 40

Release
- Original network: Sport1
- Original release: 23 March – 29 May 2026

Season chronology
- ← Previous; Season 2

Survivor 2026 is the third season of Survivor in Germany and the first to air since 2019. The season takes on a new format, the Turkish format as 20 contestants compete in two tribes in the southern part of the La Altagracia in the Dominican Republic. The season has Detlef Soost and premieres on Sport1 on 23 March 2026.

== Contestants ==
List of Survivor 2026 contestants
Contestant	Original Tribe	Jokers Enter	Day 9 Tribe	First Switch Tribe	Second Switch Tribe	Third Switch Tribe	Merged Tribe	Finish
Marcellino Kremers; 32, Mönchengladbach	Jäger							Quit; Day 3
Jessica Von Der Ohe; 39, Klingenthal	Jäger							Quit; Day 6
Selin Erkan; 28, Berlin								Medically evacuated Day 7
Anny Marry Ernst; 28, Düsseldorf	Jäger	Jäger						1st Eliminated; Day 7
Kid Haris; 32, Offenbach am Main	Krieger	Krieger	Krieger	Krieger				Quit; Day 10
Karina Macicas; 22, Stuttgart		Jäger	Jäger	Jäger				2nd Eliminated; Day 13
Phil Eßeling; 36, Wilhelmshaven	Jäger		Jäger	Jäger				Quit; Day 15
Venance Gwladys; 31, Olten, Switzerland	Jäger	Jäger	Jäger	Jäger				Quit; Day 16
Christin Okpara; 29, Harsewinkel	Krieger	Krieger	Krieger	Krieger	Krieger			3rd Eliminated; Day 23
Matti Wicke; 51, Obschütz	Krieger	Krieger	Krieger	Krieger	Krieger			Medically evacuated Day 25
Nelson Campos Mendes; 38, Cologne	Krieger	Krieger	Krieger	Jäger	Krieger			Medically evacuated Day 28
Yasemin Alida Claßen; 24, Aachen	Jäger	Jäger	Jäger	Jäger	Krieger			4th Eliminated; Day 28
Roberto De Stefano; 23, Ludwigshafen	Jäger	Jäger	Jäger	Jäger	Jäger	Jäger		5th Eliminated; Day 32
Marvin Arens; 35, Recklinghausen	Krieger	Krieger	Krieger	Krieger	Jäger	Jäger		6th Eliminated; Day 35
Collins Egege; 38, Hamburg	Krieger	Krieger	Krieger	Krieger	Jäger	Jäger		7th Eliminated; Day 37
Hayko Djan; 21, Berlin	Jäger	Jäger	Jäger	Jäger	Jäger	Jäger	Merged Tribe	8th Eliminated; 1st Jury Member; Day 40
Kristina Yantsen; 32, Düsseldorf	Krieger	Krieger	Krieger	Krieger	Krieger	Krieger	Merged Tribe	9th Eliminated; 2nd Jury Member; Day 41
Senad Gashi; 35, Marbella, Spain		Jäger	Jäger	Krieger	Krieger	Krieger	Merged Tribe	10th Eliminated; 3rd Jury Member; Day 43
Katrina Miller; 36, Berlin					Jäger	Jäger	Merged Tribe	11th Eliminated; 4th Jury Member; Day 44
Jule Brenningmeyer; 28, Berlin	Krieger	Krieger	Krieger	Krieger	Jäger	Jäger	Merged Tribe	12th Eliminated; 5th Jury Member; Day 45
Lisa Postel; 34, Jena	Krieger	Krieger	Krieger	Krieger	Jäger	Jäger	Merged Tribe	13th Eliminated; 6th Jury Member; Day 46
Daniel Pozimski; 25, Iserlohn			Krieger	Krieger	Krieger	Krieger	Merged Tribe	14th Eliminated; Day 48
Lisa Mieschke; 35, Potsdam	Jäger	Jäger	Jäger	Jäger	Jäger	Krieger	Merged Tribe	15th Eliminated; Day 48
Jun Kim; 37, Cologne	Jäger	Jäger	Jäger	Jäger	Jäger	Jäger	Merged Tribe	Runner-up; Day 49
Larissa Elena Renz; 26, Heidelberg	Krieger	Krieger	Krieger	Krieger	Krieger	Krieger	Merged Tribe	Sole Survivor; Day 49
