= Adolf Müllner =

German writer

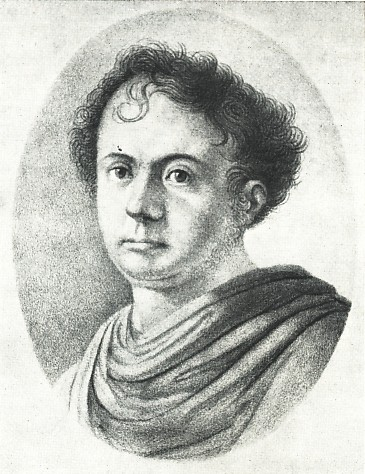
Amandus Gottfried Adolf Müllner.

Amandus Gottfried Adolf Müllner (18 October 1774 – 11 June 1829) was a German critic and dramatic poet.

Müllner was a nephew of Gottfried August Burger, and was born at Langendorf near Weissenfels. After studying law at Leipzig he established himself as advocate at Weissenfels and made his debut as an author with the novel Incest, oder der Schutzgeist von Avignon. He next wrote a few comedies for an amateur theatre in Weissenfels; these were followed by more pretentious pieces: Der angolische Kaler (1809) and Der Blilz (1814, publ. 1818), after French models. With his tragedies, however, Der neun- und-zwanzigste Februar (1812), and especially Die Schuld (1813; publ. 1816), Müllner became the representative of the so-called Schicksalsdramatiker, and for several years fate-tragedies on the model of Die Schuld dominated the German stage.

His later plays, König Yngurd (1817) and Die Albaneserin (1820), were less important. Notwithstanding his literary success, Müllner did not neglect his profession, and was given the title of Hofrat; he also edited various journals, and had a reputation as a vigorous if somewhat acrimonious critic. He died at Weissenfels on 11 June 1829.

Müllner's Vermischte Schriften appeared in 2 vols. (1824–1826); his Dramatische Werke in 8 vols. (1828; 2nd ed., 1832). In 1830 four supplementary volumes were published containing mainly Criticism.
