= Louise von François =

German writer (1817–1893)

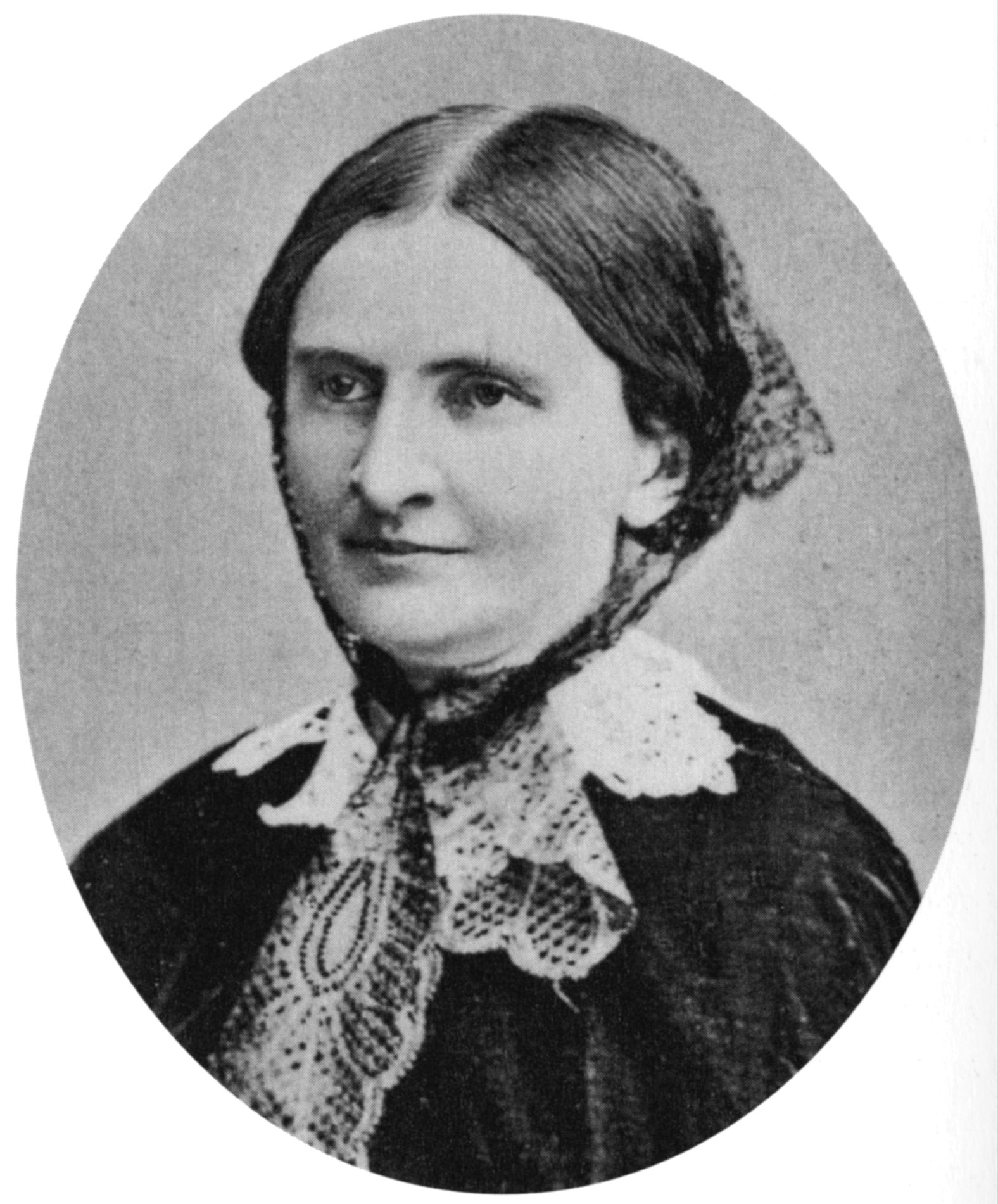
Louise von François

Marie Louise von François (27 June 1817 in Herzberg (Elster) – 25 September 1893 in Weißenfels) was a German writer, best known for her historical novel Die letzte Reckenburgerin (1871). She was a friend and correspondent of Marie von Ebner-Eschenbach and Conrad Ferdinand Meyer.

== Life ==
Louise von François belonged to the school of realism. She was the daughter of an aristocratic officer from an old Noble French family and her mother was of Saxon nobility. François educated herself by reading the works of Adolf Müllner and Fanny Tarnow. Her fathered died when she was young and her mother remarried multiple times. François' uncle took custody of her in Potsdam, where her writing career began. Her guardians squandered her inheritance and as consequence François' fiance, Count Alfred of Görtz, broke off their engagement. Penniless, François moved back to live with her mother and step-father in Weissenfels where she stayed until her death. At 54 she published Die letzte Reckenburgerin [The Last Lady of Reckenburg] her most popular novel. Marie von Ebner-Eschenbach and Conrad Ferdinand Meyer sent François admiring letters about Die letzte Reckenburgerin, starting a lengthy correspondence that was eventually published in 1905.

== Works ==
Marie Louise von François' published works as cited by An Encyclopedia of Continental Women Writers

- Ausgewählte Novelle [Selected Short Stories], 1867.
- Die letzte Reckenburgerin [The Last Lady of Reckenburg], 1871.
- Erzählungen [Stories], 1871.
- Frau Erdmuthens Zwillingssöhne [Mrs. Erdmuthen's Twin Sons', 1872.
- Geschichte der Preussischen Befreiungskriege [History of the Prussian Liberation War], 1813-1815.
- Ein Lesebuch für Schule und Haus [History of the Prussian War of Independence 1813-1815. A Reader for School and Home], 1873.
- Hellstadt und andere Erzählungen [Hellstadt and Other Stories], 1874.
- Natur und Gnade nebst anderen Erzählungen [Nature and Grace and Other Stories], 1876.
- Stufenjahre eines Glücklichen[The Pinnacle Years of a Fortunate One], 1879.
- Phosphorus Hollunder, 1881.
- Zu Füssen des Monarchen [At the Feet of the Monarchy], 1881.
- Der Posten der Frau. Lustspiel [The Situation of the Woman. A Comedy], 1882.
- Judith, die Kluswirthen [Judith, the Innkeeper's Wife], 1883.
- Das Jubliäum und andere Erzählungen [The Anniversary and Other Stories[, 1886.
- Briefwechsel mit C.F. Meyer, hrsg. A. Bettelheim [Correspondence of C.F. Meyer, edited by A. Bettelheim], 1905.
- Gesammelte Werke [Collected Works], 1918.
