= Gleichwie der Regen und Schnee vom Himmel fällt, BWV 18 =

Church cantata by Johann Sebastian Bach

Gleichwie der Regen und Schnee vom Himmel fällt
- BWV 18
- Church cantata by J. S. Bach
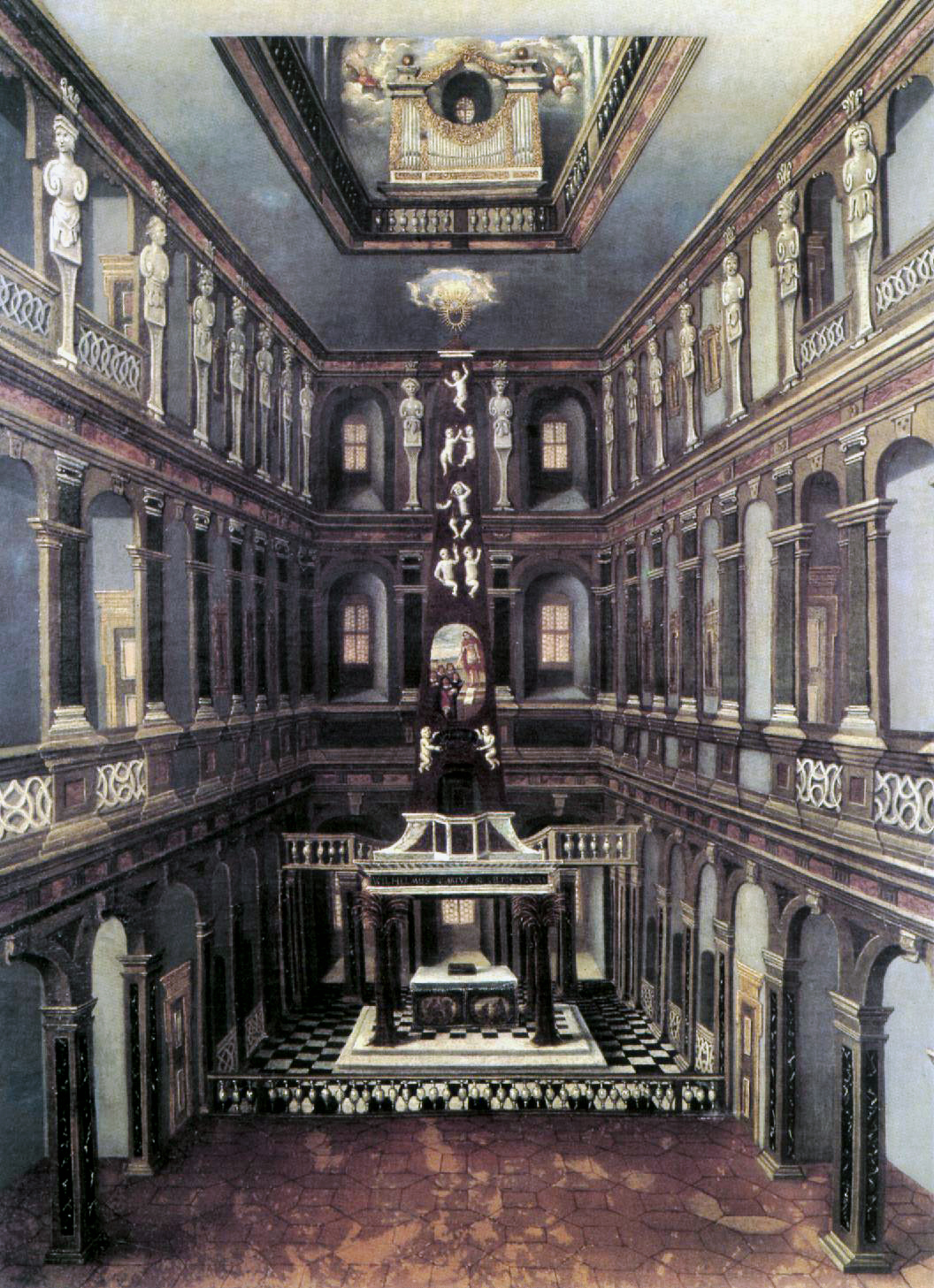
- The Schlosskirche in Weimar
- Occasion: Sexagesima
- Cantata text: Erdmann Neumeister
- Bible text: Isaiah 55:10–11
- Chorale: "Durch Adams Fall ist ganz verderbt" by Lazarus Spengler
- Performed: 1713?: Weimar; 13 February 1724: Leipzig
- Movements: 5
- Vocal: solo: soprano, tenor and bass; SATB choir
- Instrumental: 4 violas; cello; bassoon; continuo

Gleichwie der Regen und Schnee vom Himmel fällt (Just as the rain and snow fall from heaven), BWV 18, is an early church cantata by Johann Sebastian Bach. He composed it in Weimar for the Sunday Sexagesimae, the second Sunday before Lent, likely by 1713.

The cantata is based on a text by Erdmann Neumeister published in 1711. While at Weimar Bach set at least one other cantata text by this librettist; he also set others by the court poet Salomon Franck. The text cites Isaiah, related to the gospel, the parable of the Sower. The third movement is in the style of a sermon, combined with a litany by Martin Luther. The closing chorale is the eighth stanza of Lazarus Spengler's hymn "Durch Adams Fall ist ganz verderbt".

The cantata falls relatively early in Bach's chronology of cantata compositions. It was possibly composed for performance on 24 February 1715, but more likely for a year or even two earlier. Sexagesima always falls within January or February, so the title's reference to snowfall would have been relevant to the weather at the time. Bach structured the work in five movements, a sinfonia, a recitative, a recitative with chorale, an aria and a closing chorale. He scored it for three vocal soloists, a four-part choir only in the chorale, and a Baroque instrumental ensemble which is unusual in having violas but no violins. The instruments originally specified were four violas, cello, bassoon and basso continuo. When he performed the work again as Thomaskantor in Leipzig, he added two recorders to double viola I and II an octave higher, thus creating a lighter sound overall.

== History and words ==
Bach worked for the court in Weimar from 1708. As part of his work at previous posts, he had composed cantatas, but at Weimar he was at first mainly occupied with other projects. In 1713 he was offered a post at the Marktkirche, a church in Halle, but was offered inducements to stay on at Weimar. He received a promotion on 2 March 1714 which resulted in him composing cantatas on a monthly schedule. BWV 18 is believed to be one of a small number of cantatas which Bach composed at Weimar prior to 1714. Like the later Weimar cantatas, it would have been performed at the Schlosskirche, the chapel of his employers the co-reigning dukes.

Bach composed this cantata for the second Sunday before Lent, called Sexagesima. The prescribed readings for the Sunday were taken from the Second Epistle to the Corinthians, "God's power is mighty in the weak" (2 Corinthians 11:19–12:9), and from the Gospel of Luke, the parable of the Sower (Luke 8:4–15).

The cantata is based on a text by Erdmann Neumeister, a pioneer of the use of a format using recitative and aria, which was new in religious music. This text was written for the Eisenach court and published in Gotha in 1711 in the collection Geistliches Singen und Spielen (Sacred singing and playing), which had been set to music by Georg Philipp Telemann. It is one of few texts set to music in Weimar which were not written not by the court poet Salomon Franck. The text cites Isaiah in the second movement, "For as the rain cometh down, and the snow from heaven, … So shall my word be ..." (Isaiah 55:10–11), related to the Gospel about God's word compared to seed. In the third movement, the poet combines warnings of the dangers to God's word in the style of a sermon with four lines of prayer from a litany by Martin Luther. The closing chorale is the eighth stanza of Lazarus Spengler's hymn "Durch Adams Fall ist ganz verderbt" (1524).

The cantata falls relatively early in Bach's chronology of cantata compositions. It was possibly composed for 24 February 1715, but more likely a year or two earlier. The Bach scholar Christoph Wolff states: "The original performing material has survived and allows us to date the work to 1713". Bach performed the cantata again when he was Thomaskantor in Leipzig in 1724, with an expanded scoring in a different key. It was then probably performed in the same service as the newly composed Leichtgesinnte Flattergeister, BWV 181.

== Music ==
=== Structure and scoring ===
Bach structured the cantata in five movements, an instrumental sinfonia, a recitative, a recitative with chorale, an aria and a closing chorale. He scored the work, like other cantatas written in Weimar, for a small ensemble of three vocal soloists (soprano (S), tenor (T), bass (B)), a four-part choir only in the chorales, and a Baroque instrumental ensemble of four violas (Va), cello (Vc), bassoon (Fg) and basso continuo. The setting for four violas is unusual. In a similar orchestration, the Brandenburg Concerto No. 6 also omits violins.

The second version of this cantata for a performance in Leipzig adds two recorders, which double viola I and II an octave higher. John Eliot Gardiner compares the effect to a four-foot stop on a pipe organ. The cantata begins in G minor in the Weimar version, in A minor in the Leipzig version. In the following table of the movements, the scoring and keys follow the Neue Bach-Ausgabe for the Leipzig version. The time signatures are taken from the book on all cantatas by the Bach scholar Alfred Dürr, using the symbol for common time (4/4). The continuo, played throughout, is not shown.

Movements of Gleichwie der Regen und Schnee vom Himmel fällt
No.	Title	Text	Type	Vocal	Winds	Strings	Key	Time
1	Sinfonia				2Fl Fg	4Va Vc		6/4
2	Gleichwie der Regen und Schnee vom Himmel fällt	Isaiah 55:10–11	Recitative	B	Fg			common time
3	Mein Gott, hier wird mein Herze sein – Du wollest deinen Geist und Kraft	Neumeister; Luther	Recitative e chorale	T B SATB	2Fl Fg	4Va		common time
4	Mein Seelenschatz ist Gottes Wort	Neumeister	Aria	S	2Fl	4Va (unis.)		common time
5	Ich bitt, o Herr, aus Herzensgrund	Spengler	Chorale	SATB	2Fl Fg	4Va		common time

=== Movements ===
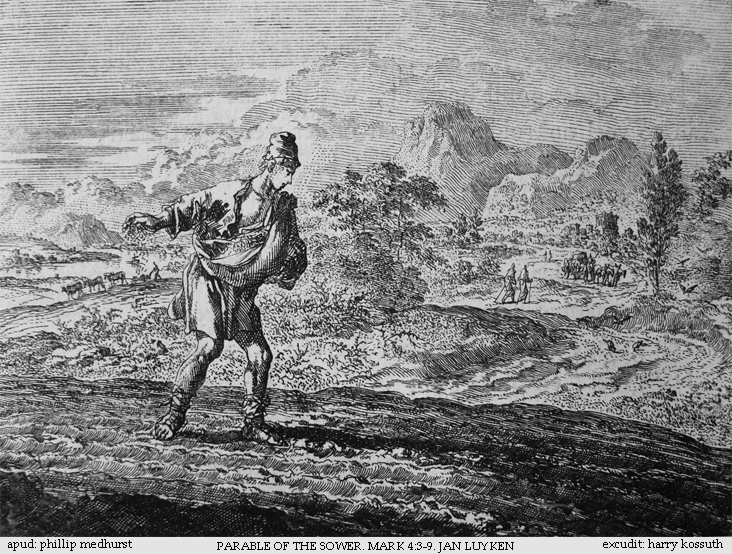
Parable of the Sower, etching by Jan Luyken

The keys in this section refer to the Weimar version, although the recording by Masaaki Suzuki, with commentary by Klaus Hofmann, uses the Leipzig keys. Hofmann notes the work's "Lutheran character", quoting Luther's litany inserted in the third movement, and sees it as a "recitative study", exploring the secco recitative of the Italian opera, introduced by Erdmann Neumeister, and also the accompagnato with rich instrumental accompaniment. Gardiner finds all three cantatas for the occasion, dealing with God's word, "characterised by his vivid pictorial imagination, an arresting sense of drama, and by music of freshness and power that lodges in the memory".

==== 1 ====
The cantata opens with a sinfonia in G minor, which illustrates falling rain and snow in descending phrases. In da capo form, it is reminiscent both of a chaconne and a concerto. The four violas and continuo, with bassoon and cello parts specified, create an unusual sound, termed "magically dark-hued sonority" by Gardiner.

==== 2 ====
The quotation from Isaiah, "Gleichwie der Regen und Schnee vom Himmel fällt und nicht wieder dahin kommet" (Just as the rain and snow fall from heaven and do not return again to it), is sung by the bass, the vox Christi (voice of Christ), in a secco recitative. This is Bach's first adaptation of recitative in a church cantata, not following operatic patterns, but "a lucid presentation of the text in a dignified, highly personal style".

==== 3 ====
The central movement, "Mein Gott, hier wird mein Herze sein" (My soul’s treasure is God’s word), is unique in Bach's cantatas, the choir soprano interrupts the prayer of the male soloists four times, followed by a conclusion of the full choir "Erhör uns, lieber Herre Gott!" (Hear us, dear Lord God!). The recitatives are marked adagio in E-flat major, while the interspersed litany is presented dramatically (allegro in C minor). Gardiner compares the imagery of the recitatives: "all adds up to a vivid, Brueghel-like portrayal of rural society at work – the sower, the glutton, the lurking devil, as well as those pantomime villains, the Turks and the Papists. He compares the movement to Telemann's setting of the same text and states:

On the other hand here is Bach, seeming to relish the contrast between archaic litany and his new 'modern' recitative style in which he empowers his two male soloists to voice personal pleas for faith and resolution in the face of multiple provocation[s] and devilish guile, with increasingly virtuosic displays of coloratura, ever-wider modulations and extravagant word-painting on 'berauben' (to rob), 'Verfolgung' (persecution) and 'irregehen' (to wander off course).

==== 4 ====
The only aria, "Mein Seelenschatz ist Gottes Wort" (My soul’s treasure is God’s word), is set for soprano, accompanied by the four violas in unison.

==== 5 ====
The cantata closes with a four-part setting of Spengler's hymn stanza, "Ich bitt, o Herr, aus Herzens Grund" (I pray, o Lord, from the bottom of my heart), It is Bach's first of many to come as the typical conclusion of his cantatas.

== Recordings ==
The selection is taken from the listing of the Bach Cantatas Website. Choirs with one voice per part (OVPP) and ensembles playing period instruments in historically informed performances are marked by green background.

Recordings of Gleichwie der Regen und Schnee vom Himmel fällt, BWV 18
Title	Conductor / Choir / Orchestra	Soloists	Label	Year	Choir type	Orch. type
J. S. Bach: Das Kantatenwerk – Sacred Cantatas Vol. 1	Jürgen Jürgens Monteverdi-Chor Leonhardt-Consort	Agnes Giebel; Bert van t'Hoff; Jacques Villisech	Telefunken	1964		
J. S. Bach: Kantaten Gleichwie der Regen und Schnee vom Himmel fällt BWV 18; Nun komm, der Heiden Heiland BWV 62	Erhard Mauersberger Thomanerchor Gewandhausorchester	Adele Stolte; Peter Schreier; Theo Adam	Eterna	1967		
J. S. Bach: Das Kantatenwerk – Complete Cantatas – Les Cantates, Vol. 5	Nikolaus Harnoncourt: Wiener Sängerknaben; Chorus Viennensis; Concentus Musicus Wien	Soloist of the Wiener Sängerknaben; Kurt Equiluz; Max van Egmond	Teldec	1971		Period
J. S. Bach: Complete Cantatas Vol. 2	Ton Koopman Amsterdam Baroque Orchestra & Choir	Barbara Schlick; Christoph Prégardien; Klaus Mertens	Antoine Marchand	1995		Period
J. S. Bach: Cantatas Vol. 5 – BWV 18, 143, 152, 155, 161	Masaaki Suzuki Bach Collegium Japan	Midori Suzuki; Makoto Sakurada; Peter Kooy	BIS	1997		Period
Bach Edition Vol. 5 – Cantatas Vol. 2	Pieter Jan Leusink Holland Boys Choir Netherlands Bach Collegium	Marjon Strijk; Robert Getchell; Bas Ramselaar	Brilliant Classics	1999		Period
J. S. Bach: Cantatas Vol. 20: Naarden / Southwell / For Septuagesima / For Sexagesima	John Eliot Gardiner Monteverdi Choir English Baroque Soloists	Gillian Keith; James Gilchrist; Stephan Loges	Soli Deo Gloria	2000		Period
J. S. Bach: Cantatas for the Complete Liturgical Year Vol. 6 (Sexagesima and Estomihi Sundays) 13	Sigiswald Kuijken La Petite Bande	Siri Thornhill; Petra Noskaiová; Marcus Ullmann; Jan van der Crabben	Accent	2007	OVPP	Period
J. S. Bach: Kantate BWV 18 "Gleich wie der Regen"	Rudolf Lutz Schola Seconda Pratica	Nuria Rial; Makoto Sakurada; Dominik Wörner	Gallus Media	2009		Period

== Sources ==
- Gleichwie der Regen und Schnee vom Himmel fällt, BWV 18: Scores at the International Music Score Library Project
- Gleich wie der Regen und Schnee vom Himmel fällt (early version) BWV 18; BC A 44a / Sacred cantata (Sexagesima) Bach Digital
- Gleich wie der Regen und Schnee vom Himmel fällt BWV 18; BC A 44b / Sacred cantata (Sexagesima) Bach Digital
- BWV 18 Gleichwie der Regen und Schnee vom Himmel fällt English translation, University of Vermont
- Luke Dahn: BWV 18.5 bach-chorales.com
