= Erdmann Neumeister =

German Lutheran pastor and hymnologist (1671–1756)

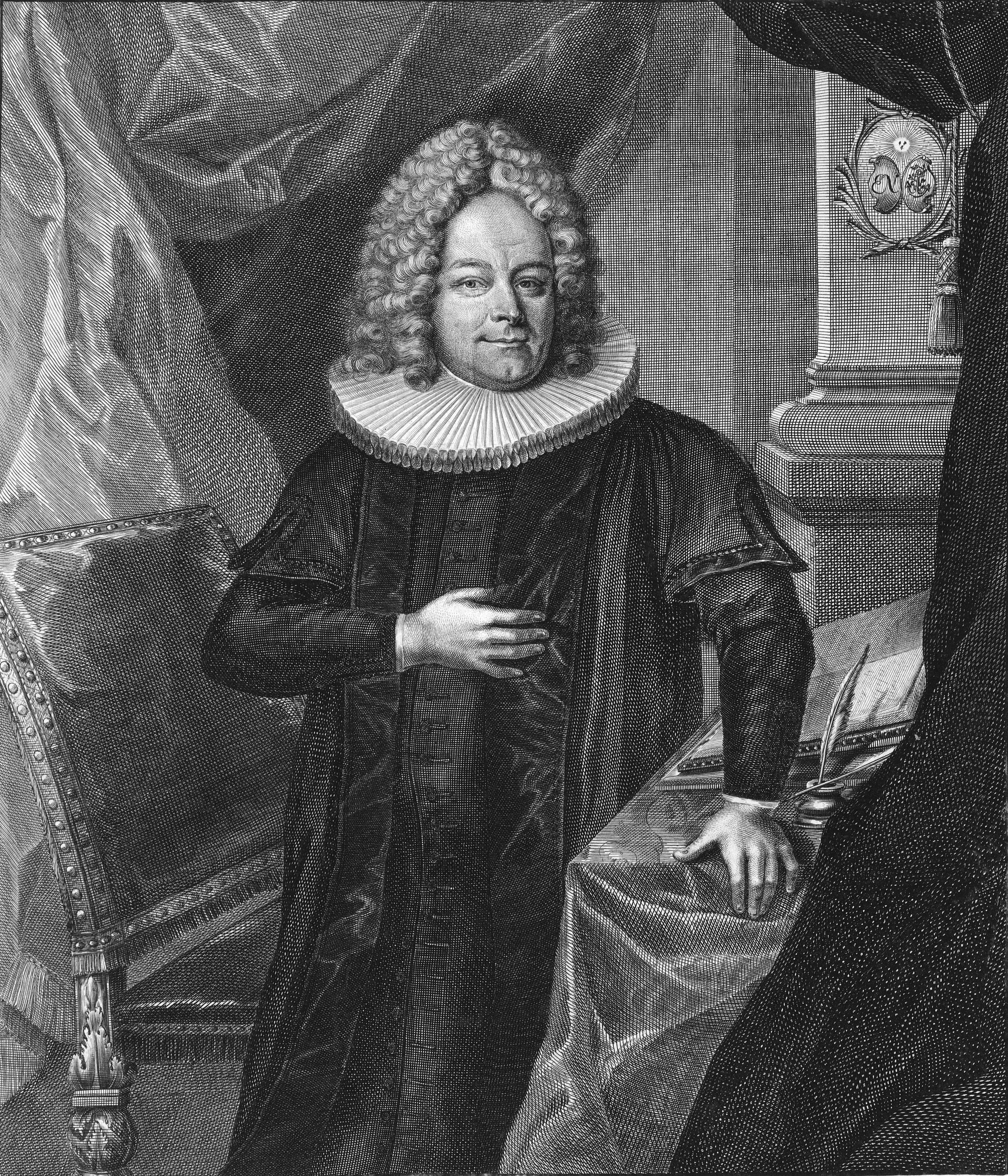
Erdmann Neumeister, 1719.

Erdmann Neumeister (12 May 1671 – 18 August 1756) was a German Lutheran pastor and hymnologist.

He was born in Uichteritz near Weißenfels in the province Saxonia of Germany. As a fifteen-year-old boy he started his studies in Schulpforta, an old humanistic gymnasium. He became a student of poetology and theology in the University of Leipzig between 1691 and 1697. He began his career as a minister of religion in the spa town of Bibra. He became diaconus (deacon) for the duke of Saxonia-Weissenfels. From 1705 to 1715, he was superintendent in Sorau (today Zary in Poland). He left for Hamburg because of theological disputes. (As an adult, he would become a vehement opponent of Pietism). He died in Hamburg as an honoured main pastor. His grave in the St. Jacobi Church was destroyed during World War II.

== Works ==
=== Hymns ===
He is remembered for several hymns, including "Jesus, Great and Wondrous Star," "God's Own Child, I Gladly Say It," and "Sinners Jesus Will Receive".

=== Cantatas ===
Neumeister was an influential writer of texts for cantatas. He was a pioneer of the use of a format using recitative and aria, which was new in religious music, but established in secular cantatas and baroque opera. This gave scope to carry over techniques from the world of secular music, and the texts were set by Johann Philipp Krieger, the kapellmeister at Weissenfels, and other composers, notably Bach. Other cantata librettists in this genre included Georg Christian Lehms.

Neumeister's first cycle of cantata texts was Geistliche Cantaten staff einer Kirchen-Music, completed in 1700 and published four years later. He began adding biblical words and chorales from his third cycle onwards. His fifth cycle of 1716 uses ode form.

=== Neumeister and Bach ===
Johann Sebastian Bach set his texts in some of his cantatas. Bach began setting his texts in about 1713 when he was working at Weimar. Later, while working at Köthen, he applied for a job as organist at Neumeister's church in Hamburg.

The following is a list of relevant Bach cantatas.

- Gleichwie der Regen und Schnee vom Himmel fällt, BWV 18 (1713?) Sexagesima
- Nun komm, der Heiden Heiland, BWV 61 (1714) First Sunday in Advent
- Ein ungefärbt Gemüte, BWV 24 (1723) Fourth Sunday after Trinity
- Wer mich liebet, der wird mein Wort halten, BWV 59 (1724), Pentecost Sunday
- Gottlob! nun geht das Jahr zu Ende, BWV 28 (1725) First Sunday after Christmas
