= Joachim Wilhelm von Brawe =

Joachim Wilhelm von Brawe (4 February 1738 – 7 April 1758) was a German poet from Weißenfels which became part of the Electorate of Saxony when he was about 8 years old.

== Biography ==
From 1755 to 1758, Brawe studied law at the University of Leipzig. Having successfully contended, in his 18th year, for a dramatic prize, he felt animated to persevere, particularly under the encouragement of Lessing and Weiße, and produced his tragedy of "Brutus," which proved very successful. He died from small-pox, in the twentieth year of his age. He died in Dresden while paying a visit to his father.

== Bibliography ==
- Der Freygeist. (= The Free-thinker.) Leipzig 2002. ISBN 3-936308-10-1.
