= Survivor (German TV series) season 1 =

Survivor
- Season 1
- Presented by: Sascha Kalupke
- No. of days: 50
- No. of castaways: 18
- Winner: Volker Kreuzner
- Runner-up: Bilgi
- Location: Malaysia
- No. of episodes: 14

Release
- Original network: Prosieben
- Original release: 14 August – 17 November 2007

Additional information
- Filming dates: May 2007 – June 2007

Season chronology
- ← Previous; Gestrandet Next → Season 2

Survivor: Überwinde. Überliste. Überlebe! (Survivor: Overcome. Outsmart. Survive!) is the first season of the German version of the reality television series Survivor. It was broadcast by the Prosieben network in 2007 and hosted by Sascha Kalupke. The prize for the winner was €250,000.

From its premiere, the show struggled to gain an audience comparable to the previous seasons. After the second week, the ratings dropped significantly and the show was relegated to an early morning timeslot. Volker Kreuzner, the oldest participant of the season, won by becoming sole survivor. Kreuzner wrote and published the book Crusoe 2.0 - Survivor Malaysia. Abgerechnet wird am Ende about his survivor adventures.

== Format ==
A group of eighteen contestants were marooned on a desert island for 50 days and split into two tribes: Gunung and Tasik. For the first half of the game, the two tribes competed against each other in reward and immunity challenges. The tribe that won the reward challenge received a special treat that made their life on the island more comfortable. The tribe that won the immunity challenge was completely safe from any eliminations for three days.

Meanwhile, the tribe that lost the immunity challenge was forced to vote one of their own members off the island, eliminating them from the competition. Contestants were free to discuss how they wished to vote, and many alliances were made and broken as the series progressed.

After the first half of the game, the remaining members of the two tribes merged into a single tribe. They then competed in reward and immunity challenges on an individual basis. After the tribal merger, every contestant who was eliminated would join a jury that decided which of the two finalists won the €250,000 prize.

== Contestants ==
Contestant	Original Tribe	Merged Tribe	Finish
Hadnet; 27, Berlin	Gunung		1st Voted out Day 3
Heiko de Lange; 28, Osnabrück	Tasik		2nd Voted out Day 6
Barbara; 46, Heinsberg	Gunung		Evacuated; Day 8
Michael Stich; 43, Darmstadt	Tasik		3rd Voted out Day 10
Kima; 24, Düsseldorf	Tasik		4th Voted out Day 14
Markus Rieger; 26, Munich	Gunung		Quit; Day 18
Eike; Returned to game	Gunung		5th Voted out Day 18
Susanne; 48, Haltern am See	Tasik		6th Voted out Day 22
Eva; 26, Tübingen	Tasik		7th Voted out Day 26
Eike; 32, Berlin	Gunung	Api	Voted back in Day 18; 8th Voted out Day 29; 1st Jury member
Philipp; 27, Erlangen	Tasik	Api	9th Voted out Day 33; 2nd Jury member
Andreas; 42, Hennef	Gunung	Api	10th Voted out Day 37; 3rd Jury member
Markus S 28, Cologne	Gunung	Api	Eliminated; Day 38; 4th Jury member
Arno; 47, Cologne	Gunung	Api	11th Voted out Day 42; 5th Jury member
Sonja; 21, Cologne	Tasik	Api	Lost challenge Day 46; 6th Jury member
Elina; 26, Mainz	Gunung	Api	12th Voted out Day 47; 7th Jury member
Jasmin; 25, Cologne	Gunung	Api	Lost challenge Day 48; 8th Jury member
Hendrik; 23, Kiel	Tasik	Api	14th Voted out Day 49; 9th Jury member
Bilgi; 35, Cologne	Gunung	Api	Runner-up; Day 50
Volker Kreuzner; 50, Windhagen	Tasik	Api	Sole Survivor; Day 50

== Season summary ==
Challenge winners and eliminations by episode
Episode title	Original air date	Challenge winner(s)		Eliminated	Finish
Episode title	Original air date	Reward	Immunity	Eliminated	Finish
"Landung auf der Insel"	August 14, 2007	Tasik		Hadnet	1st voted out Day 3
"Die ersten Nächte"	August 21, 2007	Tasik	Gunung	Heiko	2nd voted out Day 6
"Der Floßbau"	August 28, 2007	Gunung	Gunung	Barbara	Evacuated; Day 8
"Der Floßbau"	August 28, 2007	Gunung	Gunung	Michael	3rd voted out Day 10
"Geschlechterkampf auf der Insel"	September 4, 2007	Tasik	Gunung	Kima	4th voted out Day 14
"Die erste Einzel-Challenge"	September 11, 2007	Jasmin (Note: Jasmin from Gunung and Sonja from Tasik played for their teams in this challenge. The reward was a BBQ for the whole tribe. After Jasmin won the challenge for Gunung, she was made an offer to exchange the tribal reward for individual immunity until the merge. She chose immunity.)	Tasik	Markus R	Quit; Day 18
"Die erste Einzel-Challenge"	September 11, 2007	Jasmin	Jasmin	Eike	5th voted out Day 18 (Note: After Eike was voted out, Markus R arrived at Tribal Council and gave Eike his lit torch, therefore Eike immediately re-joined the game.)
"Für Gunung wird es eng"	September 18, 2007	Gunung	Gunung	Susanne	6th voted out Day 22
"Endlich wieder duschen!"	September 25, 2007	Gunung	Gunung	Eva	7th voted out Day 26
"Halbzeit bei Survivor!"	October 6, 2007	Sonja [Elina, Hendrik, Markus S, Philipp, Volker]	~~Markus S~~ (Elina)	Eike	8th voted out 1st jury member Day 29
"Zum ersten, zum zweiten, zum dritten!"	October 13, 2007	Survivor; Auction	Volker	Philipp	9th voted out 2nd jury member Day 33
"Beach-Party am "Survivor"-Strand"	October 20, 2007	Arno [Jasmin, Elina]	Markus S	Andreas	10th voted out 3rd jury member Day 37
"Unerwartete Regeländerung"	October 27, 2007	None	Bilgi	Markus S	Eliminated; 4th jury member Day 38
"Blanke Nerven"	November 3, 2007	Elina	Elina	Arno	11th voted out 5th jury member Day 43
"Blanke Nerven"	November 3, 2007	Elina, [Sonja]	Elina	Arno	11th voted out 5th jury member Day 43
"Hold your breath"	November 10, 2007	Jasmin	Hendrik	Sonja (Note: After Jasmin finished last in the immunity challenge, she had to choose another tribemate to face-off in an elimination challenge. The loser would be eliminated from the game and the winner received an extra vote at the next Tribal Council.)	Lost challenge 6th jury member Day 46
"Hold your breath"	November 10, 2007	Jasmin	Hendrik	Elina	12th voted out 7th jury member Day 47
"Showdown am Strand!"	November 17, 2007	None	Bilgi	Jasmin	13th voted out 8th jury member Day 48
"Showdown am Strand!"	November 17, 2007	None	Bilgi	Hendrik	14th voted out 9th jury member Day 49
"Showdown am Strand!"	November 17, 2007	None		Jury vote	
"Showdown am Strand!"	November 17, 2007	None		Bilgi	Runner-up
"Showdown am Strand!"	November 17, 2007	None		Volker	Sole Survivor

== Voting history ==
	Original Tribes									Merged Tribe											
Episode:	1	2	3		4	5		6	7	8	9	10	11	12	13		14				
Eliminated:	Hadnet; 5–2–1–1	Heiko; 5–3–1	Barbara; No vote	Michael; 6–2	Kima; 6–1	Markus R No vote	Eike; 4–3	Susanne; 5–1	Eva; 4–1	Eike; 8–2–1	Philipp; 6-4	Andreas; 5–4	Markus S Eliminated	Arno; 6–1	Sonja; Challenge	Elina; 5–1	Tie; 2–2	Jasmin; Challenge	Hendrik; 1–0	Bilgi; 3 votes	Volker; 6 votes
Voter	Vote																				
Volker		Heiko		Michael	Kima			Susanne	Eva	Eike	Arno	Andreas	Sonja	Arno		Elina	Jasmin	Win		Jury Vote	
Bilgi	Hadnet						Eike			Eike	Philipp	Elina	Jasmin	Arno		Elina	Volker		Hendrik	Jury Vote	
Hendrik		Kima		Michael	Kima			Susanne	Eva	Eike	Arno	Andreas	Elina	Arno		Elina	Jasmin				Volker
Jasmin	Hadnet						Eike			Eike	Philipp	Elina	Arno	Arno	Win	Elina	Volker	Lose		Bilgi	
Jasmin	Hadnet						Eike			Eike	Philipp	Elina	Arno	Arno	Win	Elina	Volker	Lose		Bilgi	
Elina	Barbara						Andreas			Hendrik	Philipp	Andreas	No vote	Arno		Volker					Volker
Sonja		Kima		Michael	Kima			Susanne	Eva	Eike	Arno	Andreas	Hendrik	Arno	Lose						Volker
Arno	Hadnet						Eike			Eike	Philipp	Elina	Volker	Sonja						Bilgi	
Markus S	Hadnet						Andreas			Sonja	Philipp	Andreas	No vote								Volker
Andreas	Not on the island						Eike			Eike	Philipp	Elina								Bilgi	
Philipp		Heiko		Michael	Kima			Susanne	Eva	Eike	Arno										Volker
Eike	Jasmin						Andreas			Sonja											Volker
Eva		Heiko		Michael	Kima			Susanne	Volker												
Susanne		Heiko		Kima	Kima			Sonja													
Markus R	Bilgi																				
Kima		Eva		Michael	Susanne																
Michael		Heiko		Kima																	
Barbara	Hadnet																				
Heiko		Kima																			
Hadnet	Jasmin																				
