= Survivor (German TV series) season 2 =

Survivor
- Season 2
- Presented by: Florian Weber
- No. of days: 39
- No. of castaways: 18
- Winner: Lara Grünfeld
- Runner-up: Stefan Graf
- Location: Fiji
- No. of episodes: 13

Release
- Original network: VOX
- Original release: 16 September – 9 December 2019

Additional information
- Filming dates: 20 June – 28 July 2019

Season chronology
- ← Previous; Season 1 Next → Season 3

The second season of the German version of the reality television series Survivor started airing on VOX on September 16, 2019. It is hosted by Florian Weber. The winner wins €500,000.

== Format ==
The show follows the same general format as the other editions of Survivor. To begin, the players are split into two or three tribes, are taken to a remote isolated location and are forced to live off the land with meagre supplies for a period of several weeks. Frequent physical and mental challenges are used to pit the tribes against each other for rewards, such as food or luxuries, or for immunity, forcing the other tribe to attend Tribal Council, where they must vote one of their tribemates out of the game by secret ballot.

About halfway through the game, the tribes are merged into a single tribe, and challenges are on an individual basis; winning immunity prevents that player from being voted out. Most players that are voted out during this stage become members of the Tribal Council Jury. When only two players remain, the Final Tribal Council is held. The finalists pleads their case to the Jury as to why they should win the game. The jurors then have the opportunity to interrogate the finalists before casting their vote for which finalist should be awarded the title of Sole Survivor and win the grand prize of the €500,000 prize.

Like other editions of the show, the German edition has introduced numerous modifications, or twists, on the core rules to prevent players from over-relying on strategies that succeeded in prior seasons or other editions of the show. These changes have included tribe switches, hidden immunity amulets that players can use to save themselves or another player at Tribal Council from being voted off and voting powers which can be used to influence the result at Tribal Council.

== Contestants ==
Contestant	Original Tribe	Switched Tribe	Merged Tribe	Finish
Karin Grathwohl; 49, Überlingen	Koro			1st Voted Out; Day 4
Jonah Oswald; 23, Neumünster	Waya			2nd Voted Out; Day 7
Abdallah Sam Kabbani; 30, Berlin	Waya			3rd Voted Out; Day 10
Stephan Mielsch; 33, Markkleeberg	Koro	Waya		4th Voted Out; Day 13
Christian Pinzger; 39, Langenfeld	Waya	Koro		Quit; Day 14
Bärbel Göbel-Stolz; 40, Coventry, United Kingdom	Waya	Waya		5th Voted Out; Day 16
Christin Kaeber; 30, Berlin	Koro	Koro		Medevac; Day 19
Juliane Froebisch; 40, Frankfurt	Waya	Koro		6th Voted Out; Day 19
Ingo Fischer; 44, Marburg	Waya	Koro		7th Voted Out; Day 20
Björn Minge; 38, Schortens	Koro	Koro	Yasawa	8th Voted Out; 1st jury member Day 22
Melanie König; 36, Bremen	Waya	Waya	Yasawa	9th Voted Out; 2nd jury member Day 25
Olav Friis; 50, Munich	Koro	Koro	Yasawa	10th Voted Out; 3rd jury member Day 28
Marcel Musial; 33, Hamburg	Koro	Waya	Yasawa	11th Voted Out; 4th jury member Day 31
Holger Freier; 60, Wiesbaden	Waya	Koro	Yasawa	12th Voted Out; 5th jury member Day 34
Sissy van Borgeld; 21, Frankfurt	Waya	Waya	Yasawa	13th Voted Out; 6th jury member Day 37
Dania Kurzhals; 28, Stockholm, Sweden	Koro	Koro	Yasawa	14th Voted Out; 7th jury member Day 38
Stefan Graf; 34, Vienna, Austria	Koro	Waya	Yasawa	Runner-up
Lara Grünfeld; 35, Cologne	Koro	Waya	Yasawa	Sole Survivor

== Season summary ==
Challenge winners and eliminations by episode
Episode title	Original air date	Challenge winner(s)		Eliminated	Finish
Episode title	Original air date	Reward	Immunity	Eliminated	Finish
"Schach mit Menschen"	September 16, 2019	Waya (Juliane)	Waya	Karin	1st voted out Day 4
"Das Kartenhaus"	September 23, 2019	Koro	Koro	Jonah	2nd voted out Day 7
"Sportler gegen Strategen"	September 30, 2019	Waya	Koro	Abdallah	3rd voted out Day 10
"Neues Glück?"	October 7, 2019	Koro	Koro	Stephan	4th voted out Day 13
"Herz oder Kopf"	October 14, 2019	Koro	Koro	Christian	Quit; Day 14
"Herz oder Kopf"	October 14, 2019	Koro	Koro	Bärbel	5th voted out Day 16
"Zerbrechliche Allianzen"	October 21, 2019	Koro	Waya	Christin	Medically evacuated Day 19
"Zerbrechliche Allianzen"	October 21, 2019	Koro	Waya	Juliane	6th voted out Day 19
"Vereinigung und Verrat"	October 28, 2019	None	None	Ingo	7th voted out Day 20
"Vereinigung und Verrat"	October 28, 2019	None	Melanie	Björn	8th voted out 1st jury member Day 22
"Zielscheibe Nr. 1"	November 4, 2019	Melanie, Olav [Holger]	Sissy	Melanie	9th voted out 2nd jury member Day 25
"Eine offene Rechnung"	November 11, 2019	Survivor; Auction	Marcel	Olav	10th voted out 3rd jury member Day 28
"Ein gutes Pokerface"	November 18, 2019	Sissy,[Marcel, Stefan]	Stefan	Marcel	11th voted out 4th jury member Day 31
"Psychologische Kriegsführung"	November 25, 2019	Dania [Lara]	Stefan	Holger	12th voted out 5th jury member Day 34
"Im Exil"	December 2, 2019	Dania [Stefan]	Lara	Sissy	13th voted out 6th jury member Day 37
"Das Finale"	December 9, 2019	None	Lara	Dania	14th voted out 7th jury member Day 38
"Das Finale"	December 9, 2019	None		Jury vote	
"Das Finale"	December 9, 2019	None		Stefan	Runner-up
"Das Finale"	December 9, 2019	None		Lara	Sole Survivor

== Voting history ==
#	Original tribes					Switched tribes						Merged tribe							
Episode	1	2	3			4	5		6		7		8		9	10	11	12	13
Day	4	7	10			13	14	16	19		20	22	25		28	31	34	37	38
Voted out	Karin	Jonah	None (Note: The first Tribal Council vote resulted in a tie. Per the rules, a second vote was held where the castaways involved in the tie would not vote and the remaining castaways could only vote for those who tied.)	None (Note: The second Tribal Council vote also resulted in a tie. The two tied castaways would compete in a fire making challenge to resolve the tie.)	Abdallah	Stephan	Christian	Bärbel	Christin	Juliane	Ingo	Björn	Melanie		Olav	Marcel	Holger	Sissy	Dania
Votes	8–1	6–3	4–4	3–3	Challenge (Note: Abdallah lost the fire making tiebreaker to Ingo.)	6–1	Quit (Note: No vote; Christian chose to quit the game.)	4–1–1	Evacuated (Note: No vote; Christin was medically evacuated from the game.)	4–2	2–0	4–2–2–1	4–2–2–1		3–1–0 (Note: Holger played a hidden immunity idol, therefore three votes against him were not counted.)	3–2–1	2–0 (Note: Stefan played a hidden immunity idol on Dania, therefore both votes against her were not counted.)	3–1	1–0
Lara	Karin					Stephan		Bärbel			No vote	Björn	Holger		Olav	Marcel	Holger	Sissy	Dania
Stefan	Karin					Stephan		Bärbel			Ingo	Björn	Melanie		Olav	Marcel	Holger	Sissy	None (Note: Dania and Stefan were not eligible to vote as the only eligible players they could vote for were each other.)
Dania	Karin									Ingo	No vote	Holger	Melanie		Olav	Marcel	None (Note: Dania came last in the immunity challenge and therefore lost her vote.)	Sissy	None
Sissy		Melanie	Ingo	Ingo		Stephan		Bärbel			No vote	Björn	Melanie		~~Holger~~	Holger	~~Dania~~	Dania	
Holger		Jonah	Abdallah	Abdallah						Juliane	No vote	Stefan	Marcel		Stefan	Lara	~~Dania~~		
Marcel	Karin					Stephan		Bärbel			No vote	Dania	Holger		~~Holger~~	Holger			
Olav	Karin									Juliane	No vote	Holger	Melanie		~~Holger~~				
Melanie		Jonah	Abdallah	Abdallah		Stephan		Sissy			No vote	Björn	Marcel	Dania					
Björn	Karin									Juliane	Ingo	Dania							
Ingo		Jonah	Abdallah	None (Note: Abdallah and Ingo were not eligible to vote in the second round of voting.)	Win					Juliane	No vote								
Juliane		Jonah	Abdallah	Abdallah						Ingo									
Christin	Karin																		
Bärbel		Jonah	Ingo	Ingo		Stephan		Melanie											
Christian		Melanie	Ingo	Ingo															
Stephan	Karin					Sissy													
Abdallah		Jonah	Ingo	None (Note: Abdallah and Ingo were not eligible to vote in the second round of voting.)	Lose														
Jonah		Melanie																	
Karin	Stefan																		

Jury vote
Episode #	13	
Day #	39	
Finalist	Stefan	Lara
Vote	5–2	
Juror	Vote	
Dania		Lara
Sissy		Lara
Holger	Stefan	
Marcel		Lara
Olav		Lara
Melanie		Lara
Björn	Stefan	
