= Schkortleben =

- Stadtteil of Weißenfels
- Interactive map of Schkortleben
- Location within Germany Location within Saxony-Anhalt
- Coordinates: 51°15′N 12°1′E
- Country: Germany
- State: Saxony-Anhalt
- District: Burgenlandkreis
- Town: Weißenfels

Area
  - Total: 7.05 km^{2} (2.72 sq mi)
- Elevation: 92 m (302 ft)

Population (2009-12-31)
  - Total: 593
  - Density: 84.1/km^{2} (218/sq mi)
- Time zone: UTC+01:00 (CET)
  - Summer (DST): UTC+02:00 (CEST)
- Postal codes: 06688
- Dialling codes: 034446
- Vehicle registration: BLK

Schkortleben is a village and a former municipality in the Burgenlandkreis district, in Saxony-Anhalt, Germany. Since 1 September 2010, it is part of the town of Weißenfels. Until then, the village of Kriechau used to be part of Schkortleben.

== Pictures of Kriechau ==
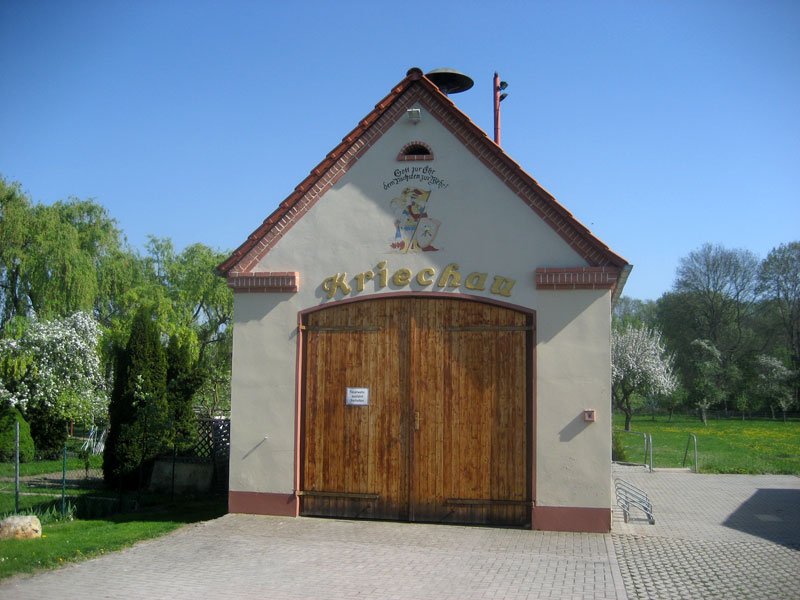
Fire department at Kriechau

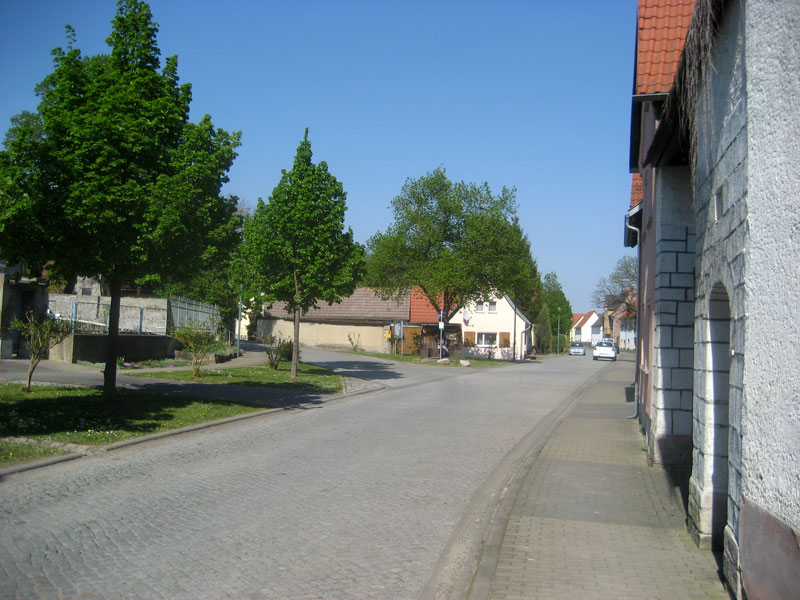
Kriechau, Friedensstraße

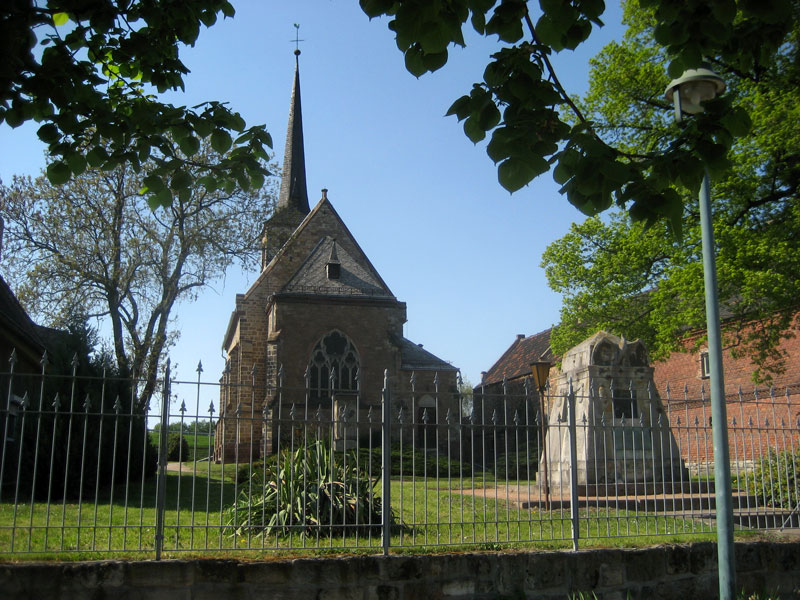
Church at Kriechau, neo-Gothic style, 19th century

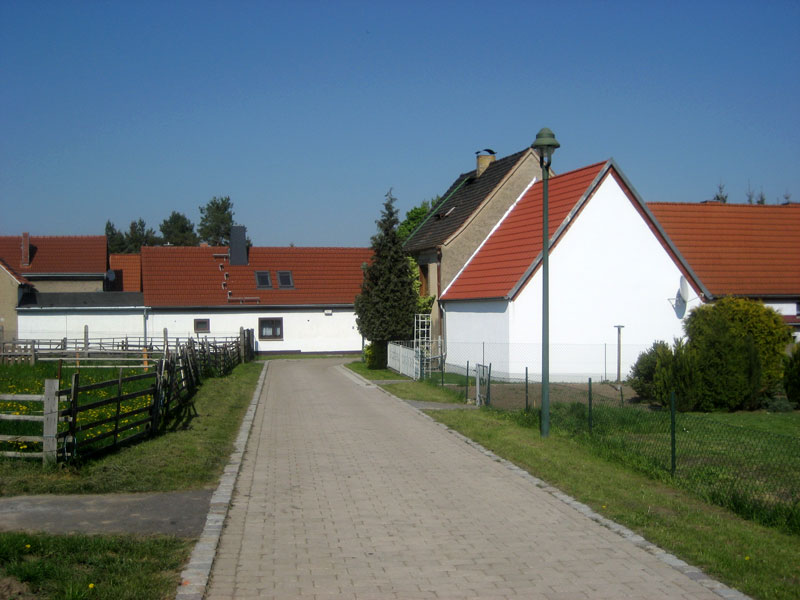
Kriechau, area behind the church
