= Burgwerben =

- Stadtteil of Weißenfels
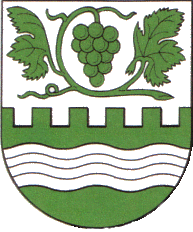
- Coat of arms
- Interactive map of Burgwerben
- Location within Germany Location within Saxony-Anhalt
- Coordinates: 51°13′N 11°59′E
- Country: Germany
- State: Saxony-Anhalt
- District: Burgenlandkreis
- Town: Weißenfels

Area
  - Total: 4.42 km^{2} (1.71 sq mi)
- Elevation: 135 m (443 ft)

Population (2009-12-31)
  - Total: 1,023
  - Density: 231/km^{2} (599/sq mi)
- Time zone: UTC+01:00 (CET)
  - Summer (DST): UTC+02:00 (CEST)
- Postal codes: 06667
- Dialling codes: 03443
- Vehicle registration: BLK
- Website: www.burgwerben.de

Burgwerben is a village and a former municipality in the Burgenlandkreis district, in Saxony-Anhalt, Germany. Since 1 September 2010, it is part of the town Weißenfels.
