= Markwerben =

- Stadtteil of Weißenfels
- Interactive map of Markwerben
- Location within Germany Location within Saxony-Anhalt
- Coordinates: 51°13′N 11°56′E
- Country: Germany
- State: Saxony-Anhalt
- District: Burgenlandkreis
- Town: Weißenfels

Area
  - Total: 3.77 km^{2} (1.46 sq mi)
- Elevation: 95 m (312 ft)

Population (2006-12-31)
  - Total: 698
  - Density: 185/km^{2} (480/sq mi)
- Time zone: UTC+01:00 (CET)
  - Summer (DST): UTC+02:00 (CEST)
- Postal codes: 06667
- Dialling codes: 03443
- Vehicle registration: BLK

Markwerben is a village and a former municipality in the Burgenlandkreis district, in Saxony-Anhalt, Germany. Since 1 January 2010, it is part of the town Weißenfels.
