= Expedition Robinson 2000 (Central Europe) =

- Season 1
- Presented by: Volker Piesczek
- No. of days: 47
- No. of castaways: 19
- Winner: Melanie Lauer
- Runner-up: Marc Lindemann
- Location: Malaysia
- No. of episodes: 13

Release
- Original network: RTL II (Germany); ORF 1 (Austria)
- Original release: 17 September – 3 December 2000

Expedition Robinson, was the first season of the Central European version of Survivor which was broadcast on RTL II in Germany and on ORF 1 in Austria from September 17, 2000 to December 3, 2000.

== Season summary ==
The main twist this season was that the contestants were split into two teams based on their country of origin, with the North team initially being composed of eight Germans and the South team of eight Austrians. The early portion of the competition saw the South team struggle to just survive as they quickly lost the first three immunity challenges leading to the elimination of three of their members.

Due to the evacuation of Claudia in episode two and the voluntary exits of Babsi and Lorraine in episodes four and six, jokers Julia, Frank, and Ulrike were added to the North and South teams (Julia and Frank to the North and Ulrike to the South) midway through the pre-merge stage of the competition.

When the tribes merged in episode eight, the former members of the South team found themselves the target of a North team based alliance and were systematically picked off until only Ulrike remained. When it came time for the final four, the contestants competed in two challenges in order to determine who would make the final two. As Thomas and Ulrike lost both of said challenges they were eliminated from the game. Ultimately, it was Melanie who won the season over Marc with a jury vote of 4-3.

== Finishing order ==
Contestant	Original Tribes	Merged Tribe	Finish
Stefan; 21, Vienna	South Team		1st Voted Out; Day 5
Claudia Bader; 22, Bobenheim-Roxheim	North Team		Evacuated; Day 7
Gerhard Arnhofer; 23, Graz	South Team		2nd Voted Out; Day 8
Andrea; 36, Hitzendorf	South Team		3rd Voted Out; Day 11
Babsi; 18, Vienna	South Team		Left Competition; Day 12
Nico Brachmann; 20, Ingolstadt	North Team		Left Competition; Day 13
Gabi Wendlandt; 36, Ottweiler	North Team		4th Voted Out; Day 15
Lorraine "Lorri" Spaughton; 21, Stuttgart	North Team		Left Competition; Day 16
Brigit Zauder; 27, Vienna	South Team		6th Voted Out; Day 19
Marcus Lengler; 32, Dresden	North Team		7th Voted Out; Day 23
Otis; 28, Ennstal	South Team	Robinson	8th Voted Out; 1st Jury Member; Day 30
Franz Tanzer; 33, Vienna	South Team	Robinson	9th Voted Out; 2nd Jury Member; Day 34
Frank; 29, Celle	North Team	Robinson	10th Voted Out; 3rd Jury Member; Day 37
Maria; 34, Vienna	South Team	Robinson	11th Voted Out; 4th Jury Member; Day 41
Julia; 23, Hanau	North Team	Robinson	12th Voted Out; 5th Jury Member; Day 44
Ulrike Paris; 21, Sankt Pölten	South Team	Robinson	Lost Challenge; 6th Jury Member; Day 45
Thomas Irawan; 22, Dortmund	North Team	Robinson	Lost Challenge; 7th Jury Member; Day 46
Marc Lindemann; 23, Hamburg	North Team	Robinson	Runner-Up; Day 47
Melanie Lauer; 19, Munich	North Team	Robinson	Sole Survivor; Day 47

== Voting history ==
	Original Tribes										Merged Tribe							
Episode #:	1	2		3	4		5	6		7	8	9	10	11	12	13		
Eliminated:	Stefan; 6/8 votes	Claudia; No vote	Gerhard; 6/7 votes	Andrea; 5/6 votes	Babsi; No vote	Gabi; 5/8 votes	Nico; No vote	Lorraine; No vote	Brigit; 4/5 votes	Marcus; 4/6 votes	Otis; 6/9 vote	Franz; 4/8 votes	Frank; 5/7 votes	Maria; 4/6 votes	Julia; 4/5 votes	Ulrike; Thomas; No vote	Marc; 3/7 votes	Melanie; 4/7 votes
Voter	Vote																	
Melanie						Nico				Marcus	Otis	Franz	Frank	Maria	Julia		Jury Vote	
Marc						Gabi				Marcus	Otis	Franz	Frank	Maria	Julia		Jury Vote	
Thomas						Gabi				Marcus	Otis	Franz	Frank	Maria	Julia		Marc	
Ulrike	Not in game								Brigit		Otis	Maria	Frank	Maria	Julia		Marc	
Julia	Not in game									Marcus	Otis	Maria	Maria	Ulrike	Melanie		Marc	
Maria	Stefan		Gerhard	Andrea					Brigit		Thomas	Ulrike	Frank	Ulrike				Melanie
Frank						Gabi				Julia	Otis	Franz	Julia					Melanie
Franz	Stefan		Gerhard	Andrea					Brigit		Thomas	Ulrike						Melanie
Otis	Stefan		Gerhard	Andrea					Brigit		Thomas							Melanie
Marcus						Gabi				Julia								
Brigit	Stefan		Gerhard	Andrea					Maria									
Lorraine						Nico												
Nico						Gabi												
Gabi						Nico												
Babsi	Stefan		Gerhard	Andrea														
Andrea	Stefan		Gerhard	Maria														
Gerhard	Maria		Maria															
Claudia																		
Stefan	Maria																	
