= Tagewerben =

- Stadtteil of Weißenfels
- Interactive map of Tagewerben
- Location within Germany Location within Saxony-Anhalt
- Coordinates: 51°14′N 11°57′E
- Country: Germany
- State: Saxony-Anhalt
- District: Burgenlandkreis
- Town: Weißenfels

Area
  - Total: 7.16 km^{2} (2.76 sq mi)
- Elevation: 128 m (420 ft)

Population (2009-12-31)
  - Total: 811
  - Density: 113/km^{2} (293/sq mi)
- Time zone: UTC+01:00 (CET)
  - Summer (DST): UTC+02:00 (CEST)
- Postal codes: 06667
- Dialling codes: 03443
- Vehicle registration: BLK
- Website: www.tagewerben.de

Tagewerben is a village and a former municipality in the Burgenlandkreis district, in Saxony-Anhalt, Germany. Since 1 September 2010, it is part of the town Weißenfels.
