= Großkorbetha =

- Stadtteil of Weißenfels
- Interactive map of Großkorbetha
- Location within Germany Location within Saxony-Anhalt
- Coordinates: 51°15′36″N 12°1′52″E
- Country: Germany
- State: Saxony-Anhalt
- District: Burgenlandkreis
- Town: Weißenfels

Area
  - Total: 12.68 km^{2} (4.90 sq mi)
- Elevation: 108 m (354 ft)

Population (2009-12-31)
  - Total: 1,923
  - Density: 151.7/km^{2} (392.8/sq mi)
- Time zone: UTC+01:00 (CET)
  - Summer (DST): UTC+02:00 (CEST)
- Postal codes: 06688
- Dialling codes: 034446
- Vehicle registration: WSF

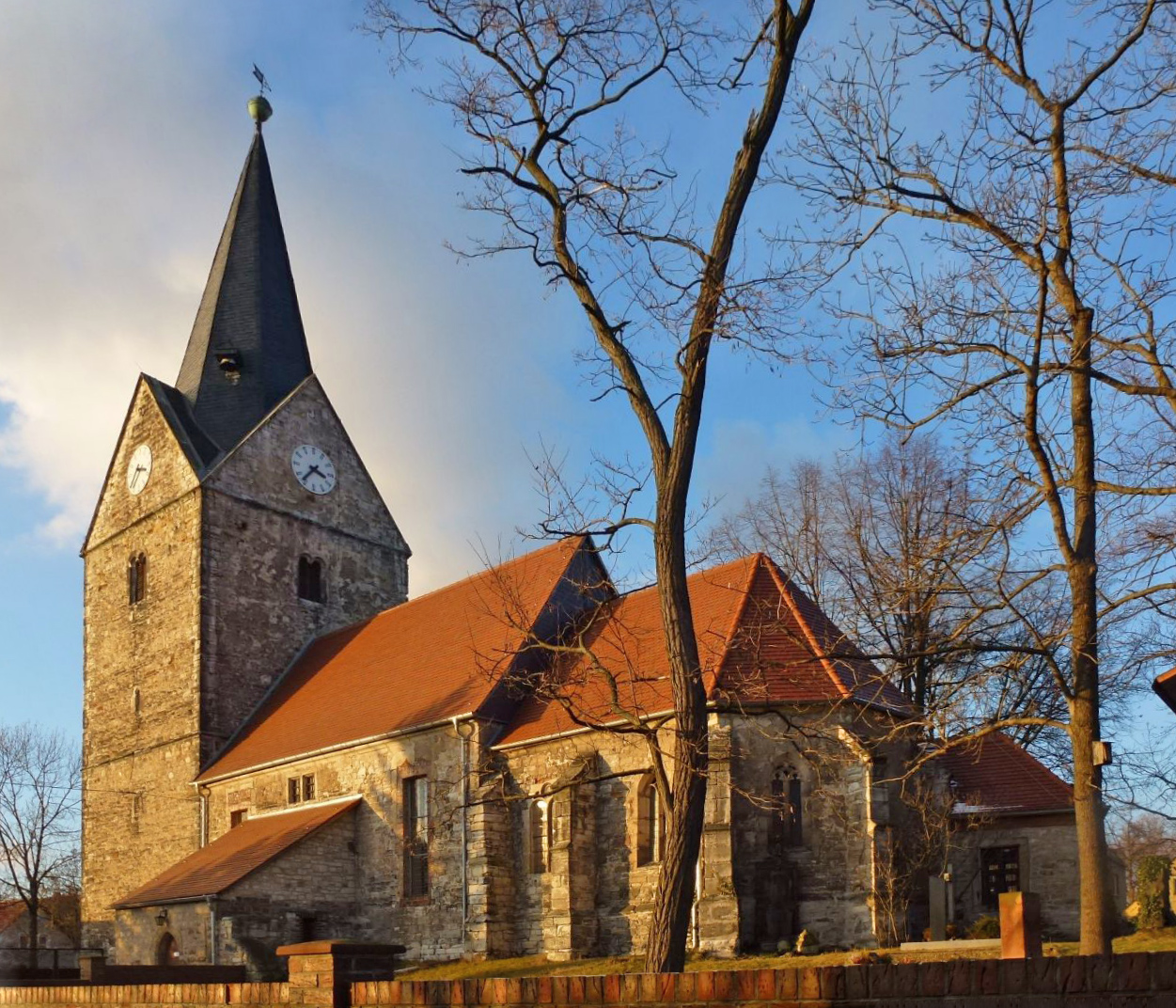
Großkorbetha Church

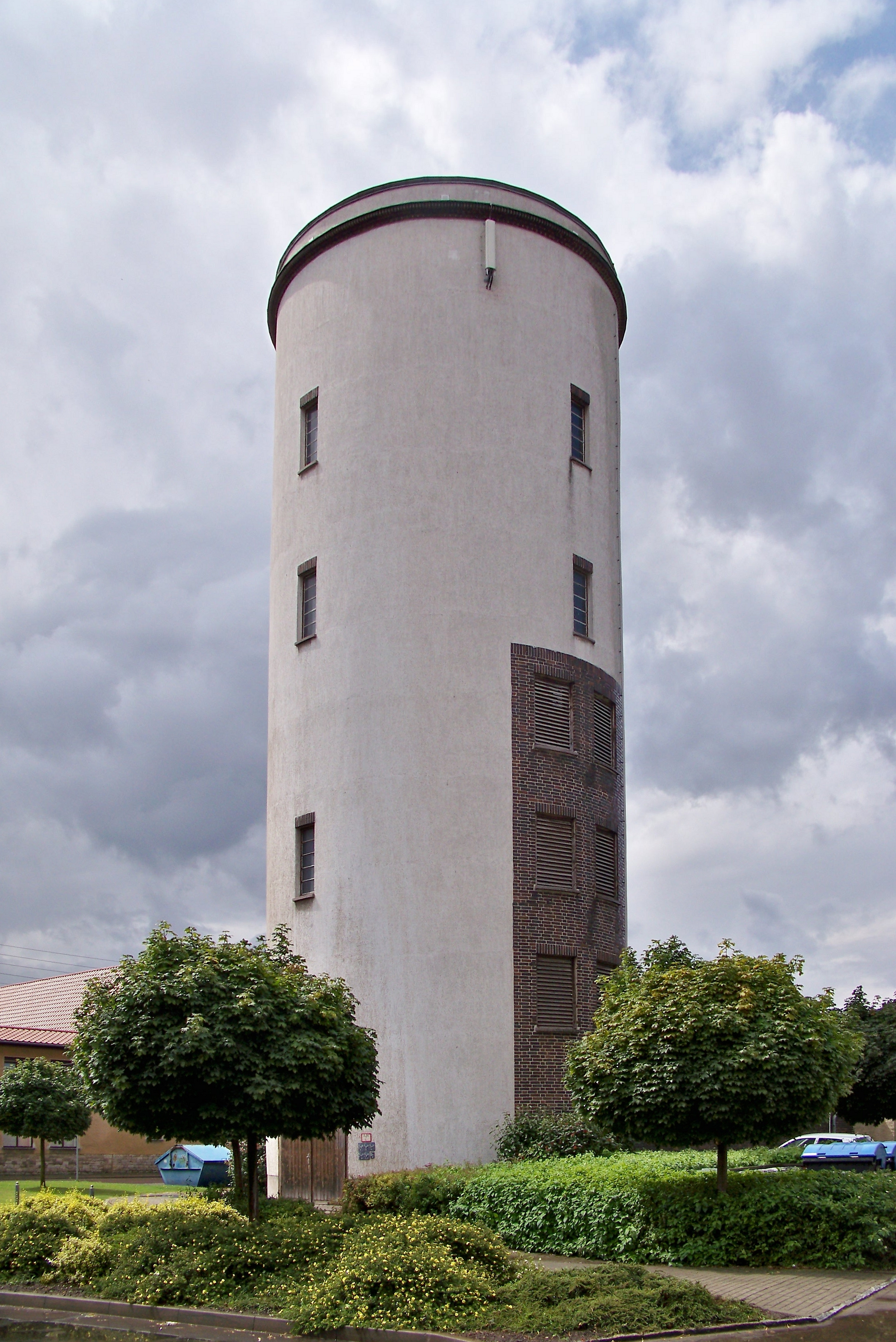
Water tower

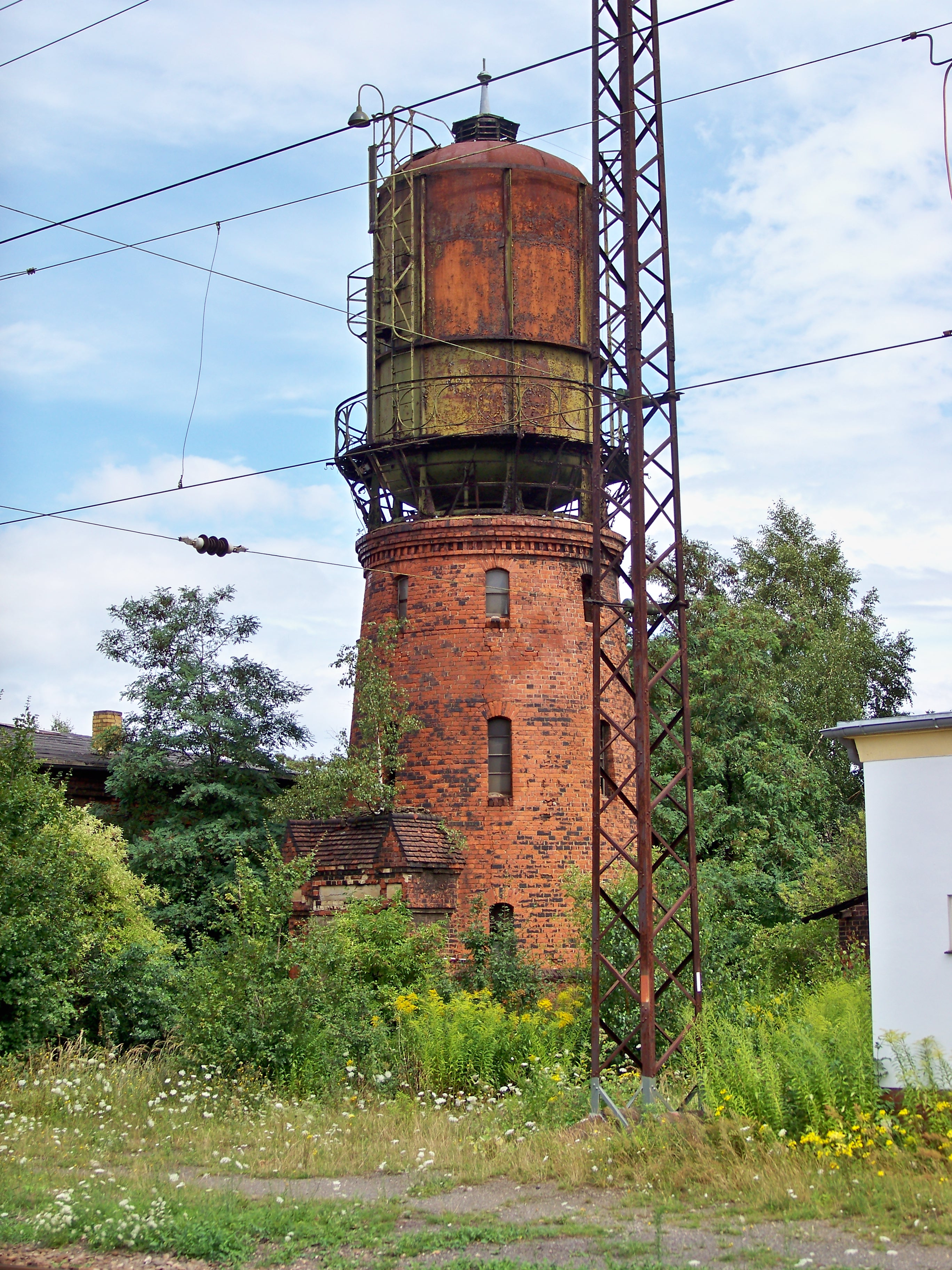
Water tower near the train station

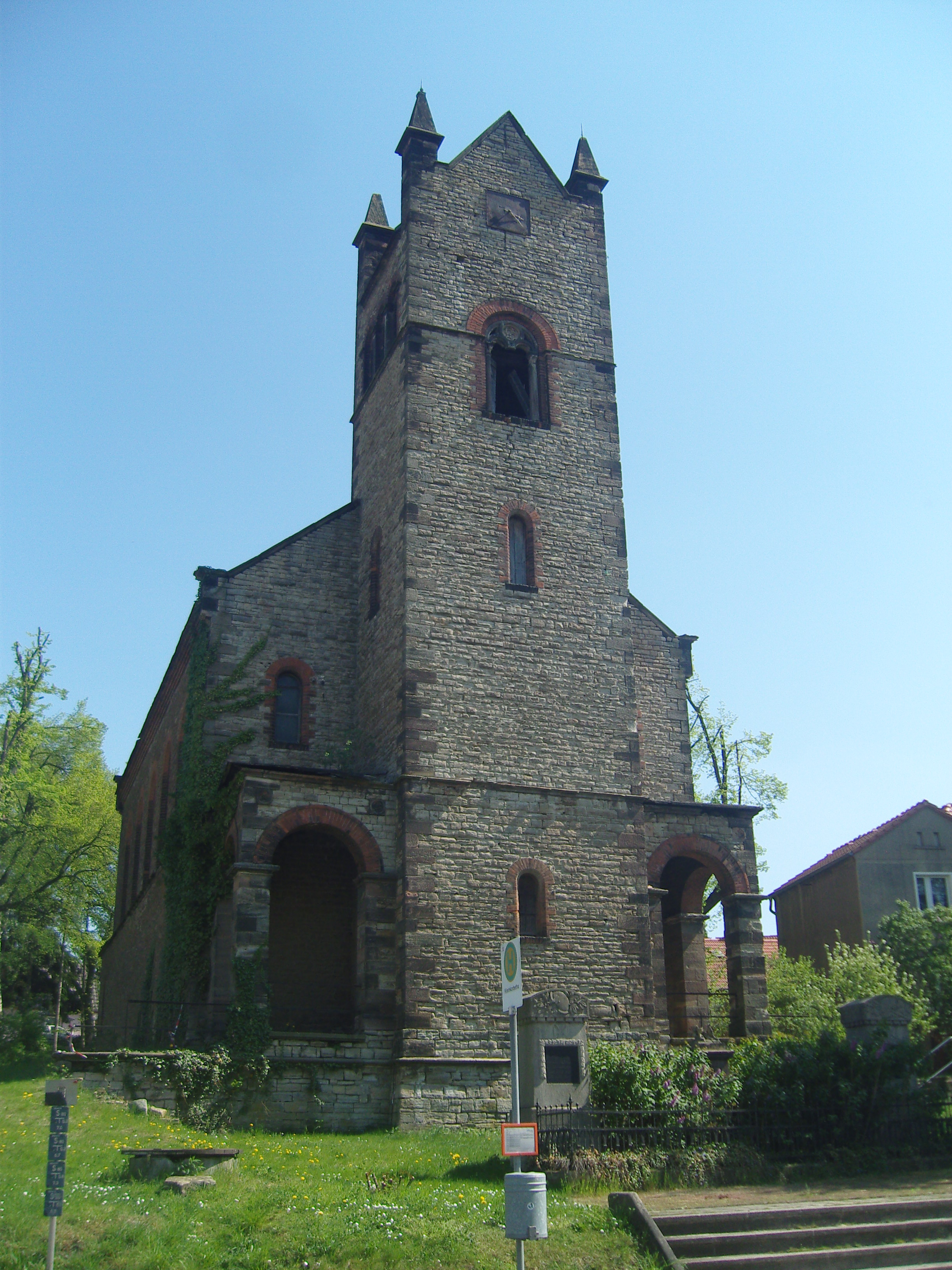
Kleinkorbetha Church

Großkorbetha is a village and a former municipality in the Burgenlandkreis district, in Saxony-Anhalt, Germany. Since 1 September 2010, it is part of the town Weißenfels.

== Historical Population ==
Like many urban centres in the former East Germany, the population has declined since the Reunification of Germany.

Development of population (as of December 31 from 1995 on):

Year	Inhabitants
1840	581
1931	1,798
1990	2,358 *
1995	2,235
2000	2,204
2005	2,031
2006	2,008
2007	1,965

* 3 October (census)
