= Leißling =

- Stadtteil of Weißenfels
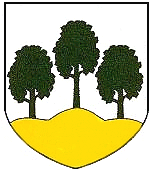
- Coat of arms
- Interactive map of Leißling
- Location within Germany Location within Saxony-Anhalt
- Coordinates: 51°11′N 11°54′E
- Country: Germany
- State: Saxony-Anhalt
- District: Burgenlandkreis
- Town: Weißenfels

Area
  - Total: 7.47 km^{2} (2.88 sq mi)
- Elevation: 155 m (509 ft)

Population (2009-12-31)
  - Total: 1,512
  - Density: 202/km^{2} (524/sq mi)
- Time zone: UTC+01:00 (CET)
  - Summer (DST): UTC+02:00 (CEST)
- Postal codes: 06667
- Dialling codes: 03443
- Vehicle registration: BLK
- Website: www.teucherner-land.de

Leißling (or Leissling) is a village and a former municipality in the Burgenlandkreis district, in Saxony-Anhalt, Germany. Since 1 September 2010, it is part of the town Weißenfels.

== Location ==
Leißling lies south-west of Weißenfels on the Saale.

== History ==
The first documented mention of Leißling was made in the year 1232. On 1 September 2010 the village was annexed by Weißenfels.

== Monuments ==
- Stone on Market Street in memory of the communist working athlete Otto Müller, who was sentenced to jail and died in 999th Light Afrika Division (Germany).
- Plaque on the house in Karl Marx Square where the communist functionary Fritz Schellbach, who died young in a Nazi Concentration Camp in 1944, was born.

== Coat of arms ==
Coat of arms was approved in 1995 by the local government office in Halle.

== Twinning ==
The town is twinned with Carlsberg in Rheinland-Pfalz.

== Sights ==
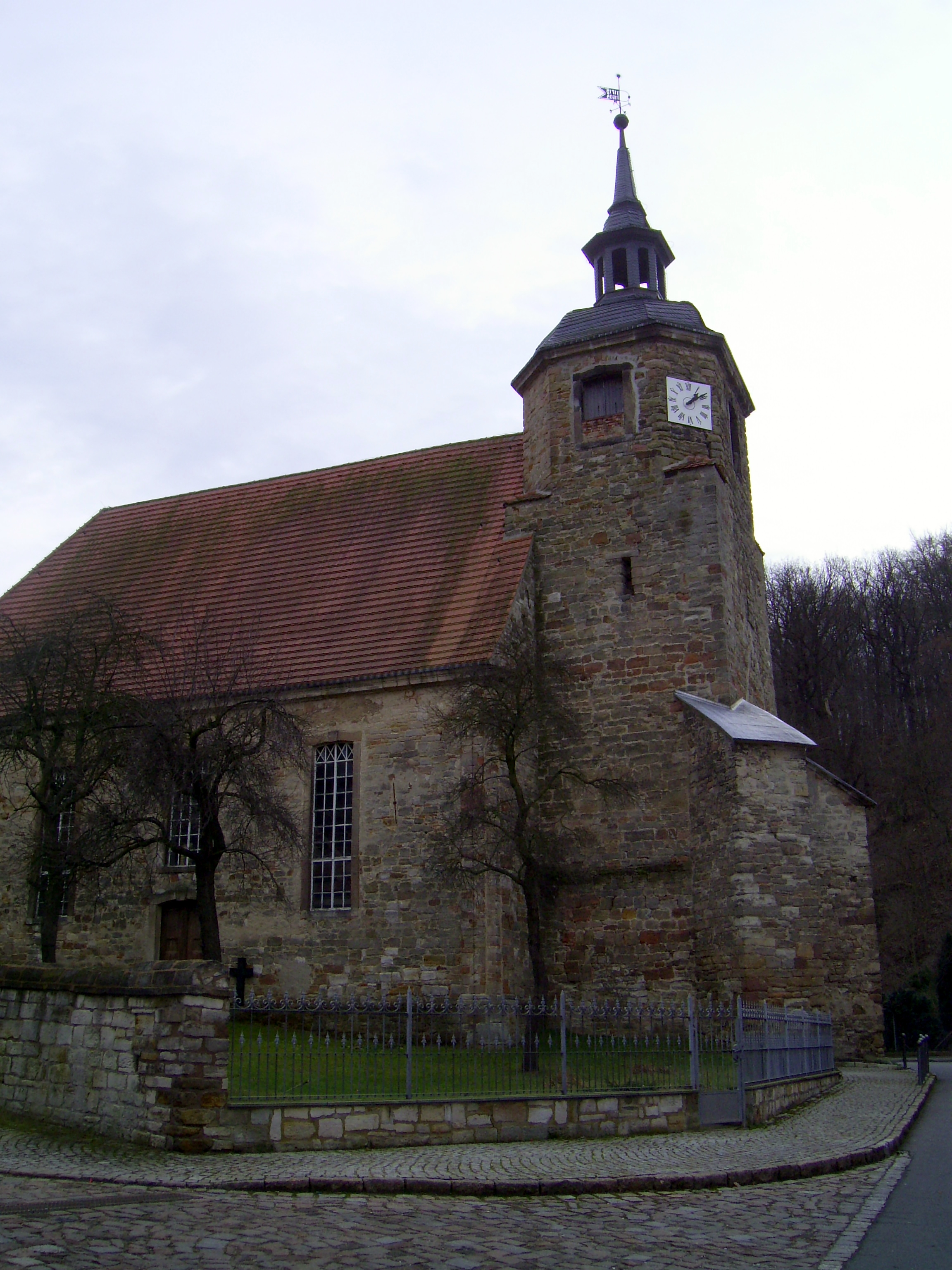
Kirche Leißling

The Marion Church is a baroque church with pictures. It was consecrated in 1716.

== Economy and Infrastructure ==
=== Economy ===
Leißling is well known for its mineral springs, which a company called Mitteldeutsche Erfrischungsgetränke GmbH & Co. KG uses for Leißlinger Mineral water. The largest shopping center in a 10-mile radius is found in Leißling.

=== Transportation ===
The National Road B87 passes near Leißling. Leißling is a station on the Thüringer Bahn from Erfurt to Halle.

=== Sport ===
Th football club Fortuna Leißling was founded around 1930. Games are played on the "monastery meadow". In the past there were also more clubs: cycling, bowling and gymnastics.
