= Reichardtswerben =

- Stadtteil of Weißenfels
- Interactive map of Reichardtswerben
- Location within Germany Location within Saxony-Anhalt
- Coordinates: 51°15′N 11°57′E
- Country: Germany
- State: Saxony-Anhalt
- District: Burgenlandkreis
- Town: Weißenfels

Area
  - Total: 9.30 km^{2} (3.59 sq mi)
- Elevation: 131 m (430 ft)

Population (2009-12-31)
  - Total: 1,227
  - Density: 132/km^{2} (342/sq mi)
- Time zone: UTC+01:00 (CET)
  - Summer (DST): UTC+02:00 (CEST)
- Postal codes: 06667
- Dialling codes: 03443
- Vehicle registration: BLK
- Website: www.reichardtswerben.de

Reichardtswerben is a village and a former municipality in the Burgenlandkreis district, in Saxony-Anhalt, Germany.

Since 1 September 2010, it is part of the town Weißenfels.
