= Langendorf, Saxony-Anhalt =

Langendorf
- Stadtteil of Weißenfels
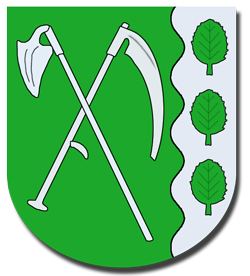
- Coat of arms
- Interactive map of Langendorf
- Location within Germany Location within Saxony-Anhalt
- Coordinates: 51°11′N 11°58′E
- Country: Germany
- State: Saxony-Anhalt
- District: Burgenlandkreis
- Town: Weißenfels

Area
  - Total: 14.53 km^{2} (5.61 sq mi)
- Elevation: 176 m (577 ft)

Population (2006-12-31)
  - Total: 2,475
  - Density: 170.3/km^{2} (441.2/sq mi)
- Time zone: UTC+01:00 (CET)
  - Summer (DST): UTC+02:00 (CEST)
- Postal codes: 06667
- Dialling codes: 03443

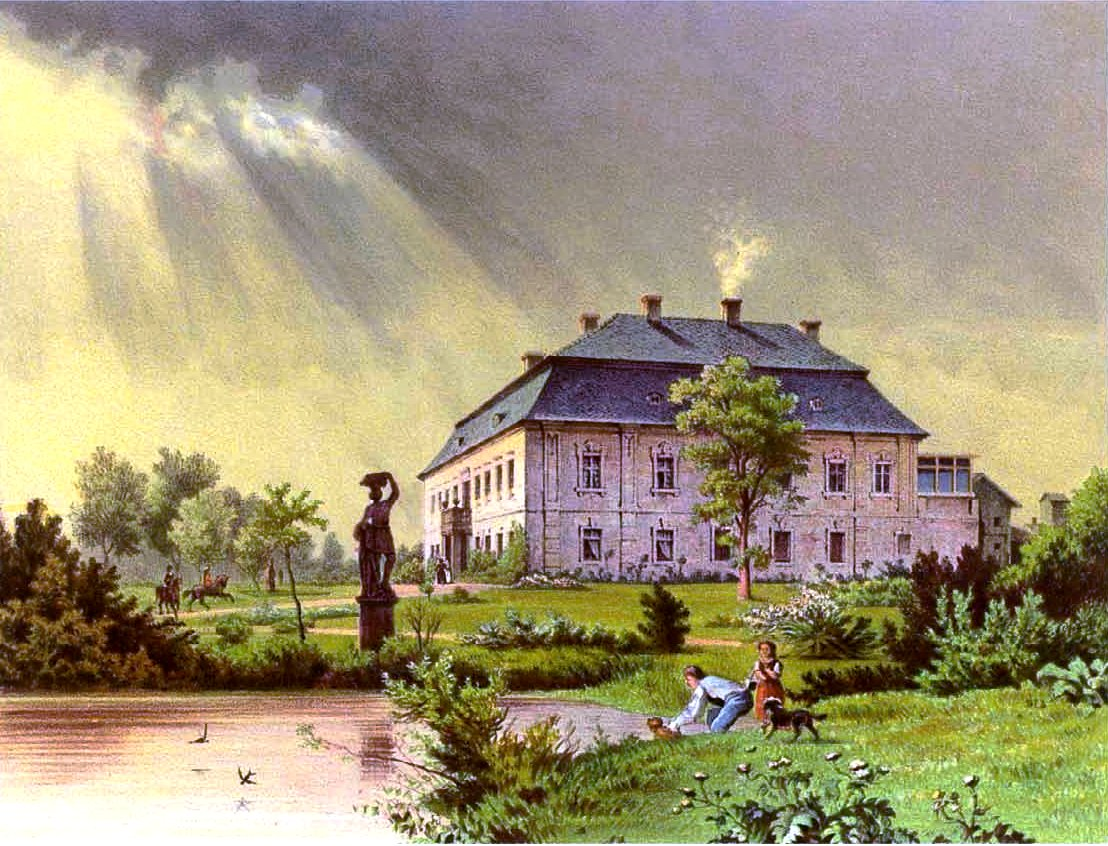
Schloss in Langendorf, a painting by Alexander Duncker

Langendorf (German pronunciation: [ˈlaŋəndɔʁf]) is a village and a former municipality in the Burgenlandkreis district, in Saxony-Anhalt, Germany.

Since 1 January 2010, it is part of the town Weißenfels.
