= Marjon Strijk =

Dutch classical soprano

- Born: Netherlands
- Occupation: Classical soprano
- Website: www.marjonstrijk.nl

Marjon Strijk is a Dutch classical soprano. She is focused on Renaissance and Baroque music. She has recorded Bach cantatas with the Holland Boys Choir, conducted by Pieter Jan Leusink.

== Career ==
Strijk studied voice with Jeanne Companjen, Eugenie Ditewig and later with Bas Ramselaar. She took master-classes of Ulrich Eisenlohr and Michael Chance.

She has performed regularly with the Holland Boys Choir, conducted by Pieter Jan Leusink, not only in their recordings of all church cantatas by Bach, but also Willem de Fesch's Missa Paschalis, Gregorio Allegri's Miserere, Bach's St Matthew Passion and Mozart's Requiem. She also performed contemporary music, including John Rutter's Requiem and the premiere of Gert Oost's Angel of Light. A reviewer of the Bach cantata recordings describes her voice as even and pure, "very attractive in its naiveté", "almost like a boy soprano".
