= Storkau, Weißenfels =

Storkau
- Stadtteil of Weißenfels
- Interactive map of Storkau
- Location within Germany Location within Saxony-Anhalt
- Coordinates: 51°14′N 11°55′E
- Country: Germany
- State: Saxony-Anhalt
- District: Burgenlandkreis
- Town: Weißenfels

Area
  - Total: 7.94 km^{2} (3.07 sq mi)
- Elevation: 163 m (535 ft)

Population (2009-12-31)
  - Total: 574
  - Density: 72.3/km^{2} (187/sq mi)
- Time zone: UTC+01:00 (CET)
  - Summer (DST): UTC+02:00 (CEST)
- Postal codes: 06667
- Dialling codes: 03443
- Vehicle registration: BLK

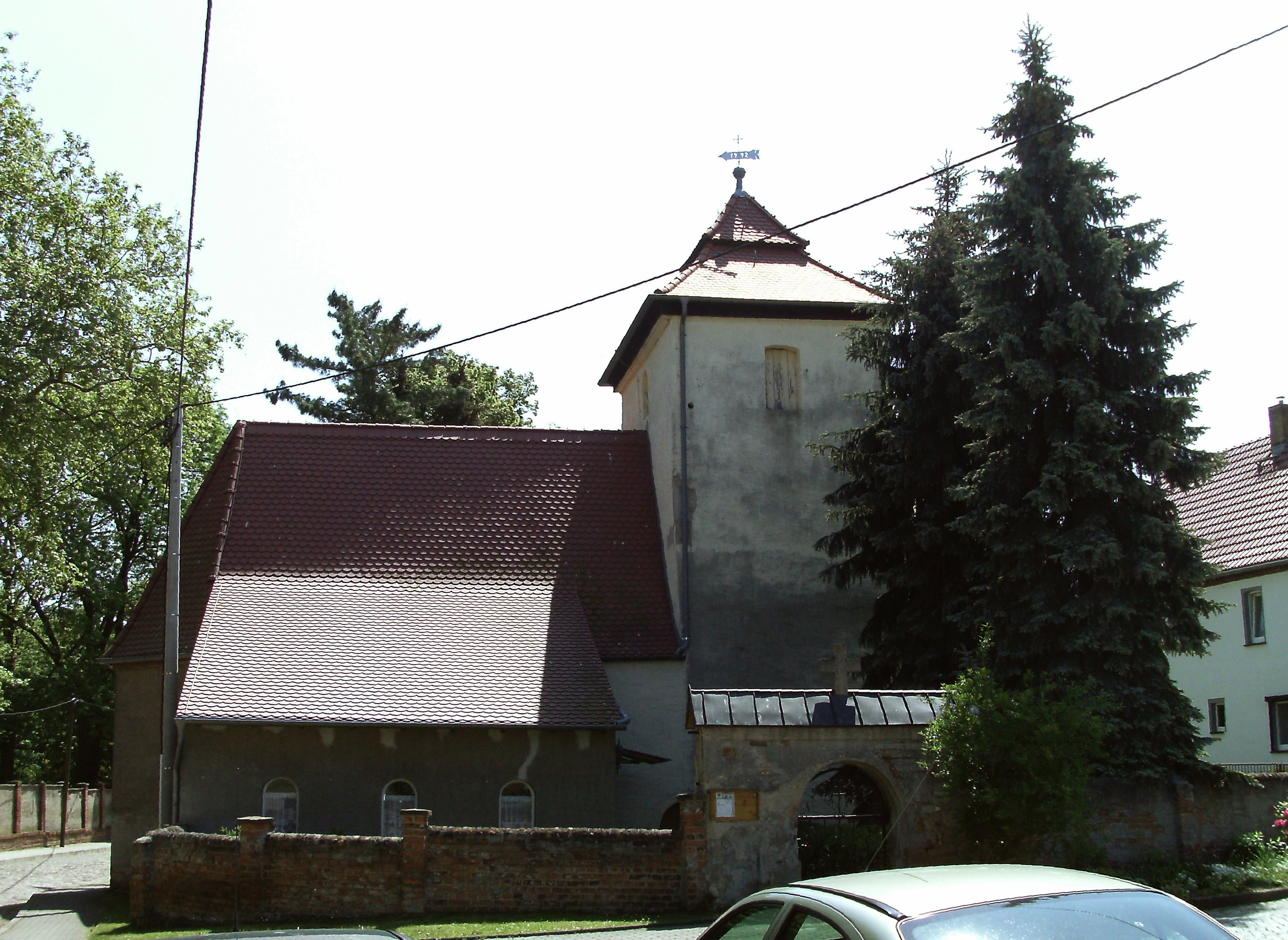
Church of St. Vincenz and Gangolf at Storkau

Storkau is a village between Weißenfels and Querfurt and a former municipality in the Burgenlandkreis district, in Saxony-Anhalt, Germany. Since 1 September 2010, it is part of the town Weißenfels.
