= Weißenfels =

Town in Saxony-Anhalt, Germany

- Town
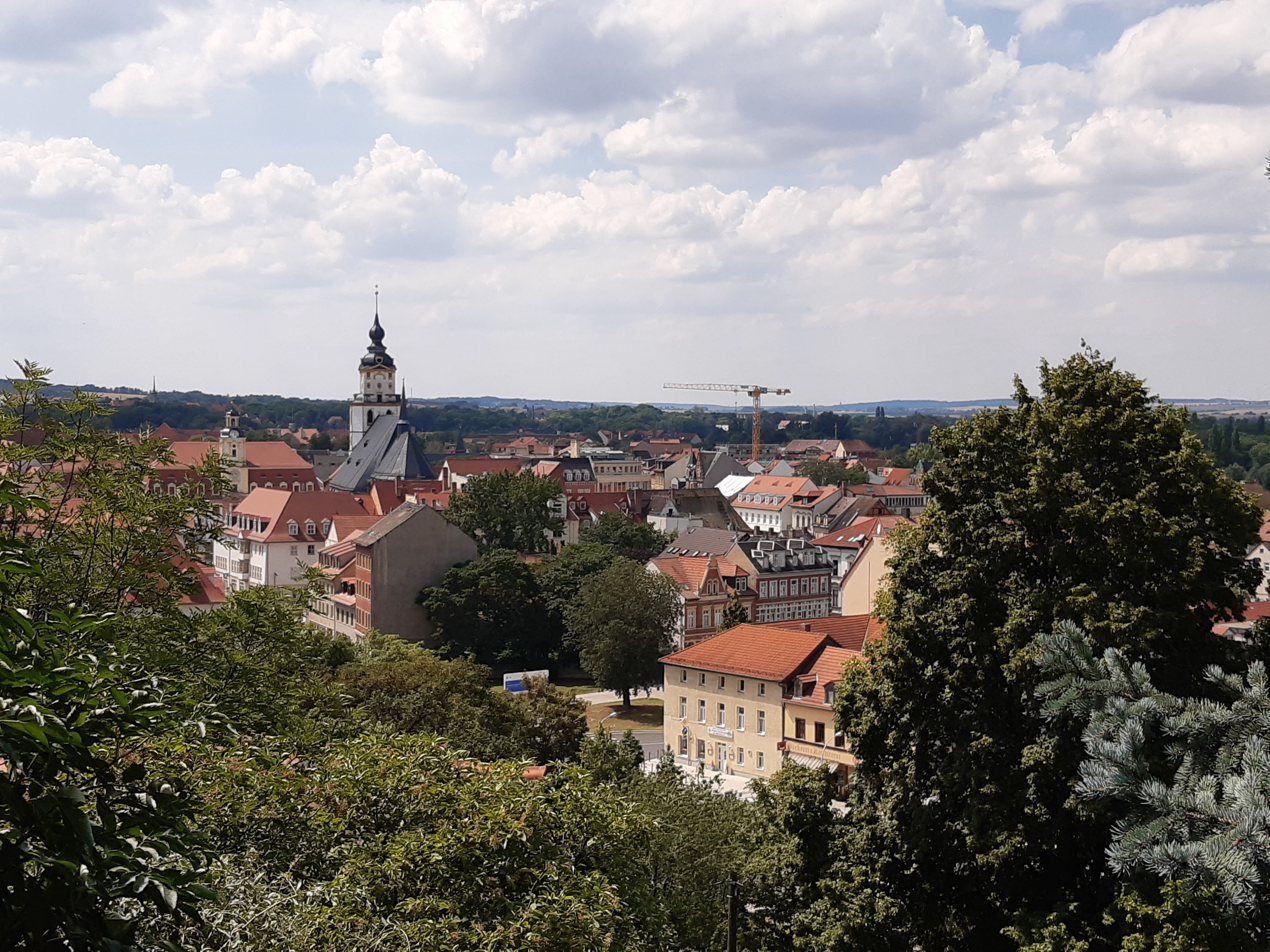

- Flag Coat of arms

- Location of Weißenfels within Burgenlandkreis district
- Interactive map of Weißenfels
- Location within Germany Location within Saxony-Anhalt
- Coordinates: 51°12′N 11°58′E
- Country: Germany
- State: Saxony-Anhalt
- District: Burgenlandkreis

Government
  - Mayor (2022–29): Martin Papke (CDU)

Area
  - Total: 113.56 km^{2} (43.85 sq mi)
- Elevation: 100 m (330 ft)

Population (2025-12-31)
  - Total: 37,308
  - Density: 328.53/km^{2} (850.89/sq mi)
- Time zone: UTC+01:00 (CET)
  - Summer (DST): UTC+02:00 (CEST)
- Postal codes: 06667, 06688, 06652
- Dialling codes: 03443, 034446
- Vehicle registration: BLK, WSF
- Website: www.weissenfels.de

Weißenfels (German pronunciation: [ˈvaɪsn̩ˌfɛls]; often written in English as Weissenfels) is the largest city of the Burgenlandkreis district, in southern Saxony-Anhalt, central Germany. It is situated on the river Saale, approximately 30 km (20 mi) south of Halle.

== History ==
Historical affiliations

Electorate of Saxony 1485–1656
Saxe-Weissenfels 1656–1746
Electorate of Saxony 1746–1806
Kingdom of Saxony 1806–1815
Kingdom of Prussia 1815–1871
German Empire 1871–1918
Weimar Republic 1918–1933
Nazi Germany 1933–1945
Allied-occupied Germany 1945–1949
East Germany 1949–1990
Germany 1990–present

Perhaps the first mention of the area, before the city itself was founded occurred in 806 CE, when Charles the Younger (Karl der Jüngere), King of the Franks, fought and killed two West Slavic Knezy (princes) nearby: duke Miliduch of the Sorbs and Nessyta (possibly also a Sorbian leader). Miliduch had led a Sorbian invasion of Austrasia.

The settlement arose around a castle on a ford crossing the Saale and received municipal rights in 1185. During the Thirty Years' War, the town was badly damaged and the population fell from 2200 to 960. On 7 November 1632 the body of King Gustavus Adolphus of Sweden was first laid out at Weißenfels after he had been killed the day before at the Battle of Lützen.

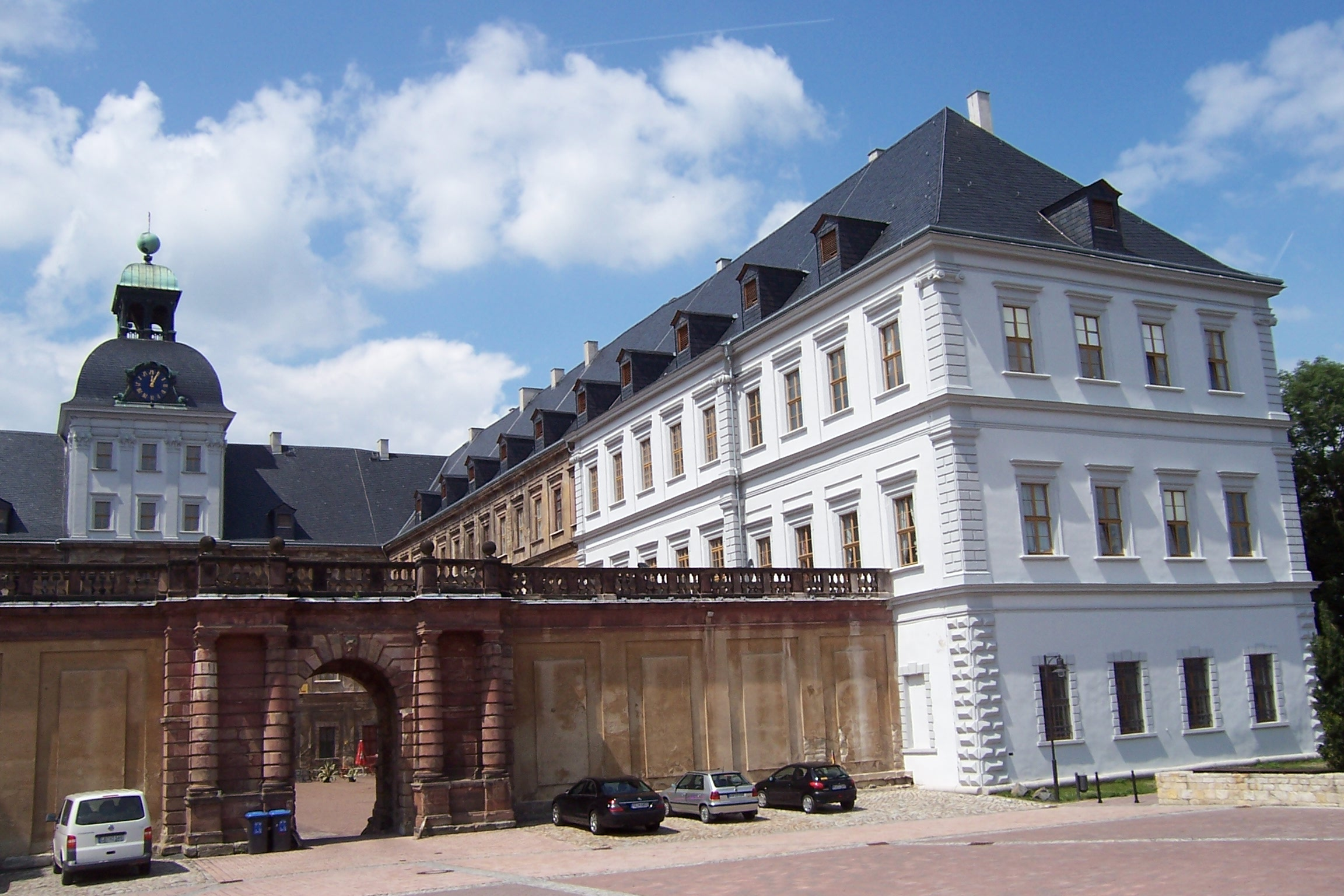
Neu-Augustusburg Palace

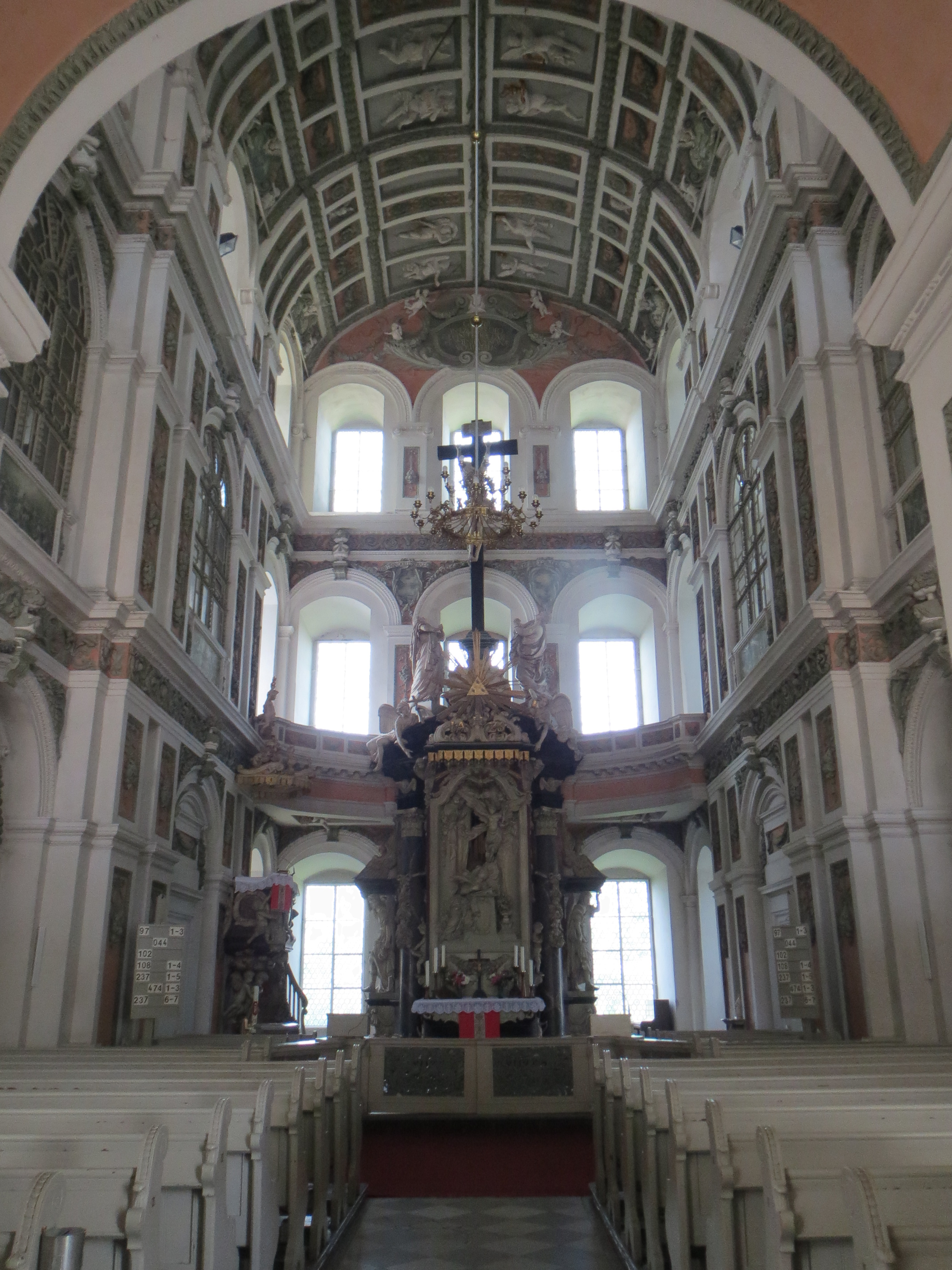
Palace Chapel of the Holy Trinity

Shortly afterwards however, the town took a steep rise in importance, when Duke Augustus, a scion of the Saxon House of Wettin, established the Duchy of Saxe-Weissenfels in 1656 and chose Weißenfels as his residence and as the capital of the duchy. Since 1638 Augustus had served as the Protestant administrator of the Magdeburg archbishopric, which, according to the 1648 Peace of Westphalia would be finally secularised to Brandenburg-Prussia upon his death.

Augustus therefore from 1660 onward erected the Baroque Neu-Augustusburg Castle on a hill in Weißenfels as the seat of his ducal successors. Completed in 1680 it became the duchy's administrative as well as cultural centre until its dissolution in 1746. Composers like Johann Philipp Krieger and Georg Philipp Telemann worked here, the actress Friederike Caroline Neuber made her first appearances at Weißenfels. In 1702 Johann Sebastian Bach's application for the position of the organist in Sangerhausen (belonging to Weißenfels) failed, because the Duke of Saxe-Weissenfels preferred the—rediscovered in 2010—composer Johann Augustin Kobelius. In 1713 Johann Sebastian Bach dedicated his cantata Was mir behagt, ist nur die muntre Jagd, BWV 208 to Duke Christian of Saxe-Weissenfels.

The Lutheran theologian Erdmann Neumeister from 1704 on served as a deacon at the ducal palace's Trinity Chapel. Its pipe organ completed in 1673 has 22 stops. According to John Mainwaring, Duke Johann Adolf I of Saxe-Weissenfels himself discovered the musical talent of George Frideric Handel, when he heard the son of his physician Georg Händel playing on the organ. Bach wrote the Toccata and Fugue in F major (BWV 540) for it.

With the extinction of the Wettin Saxe-Weissenfels line in 1746, the town fell back to the Saxon Electorate and after the 1815 Congress of Vienna to the Prussian Province of Saxony. From 1816 on it was the capital of the Weißenfels district until its dissolution in 2007.

=== 20th Century ===
By 1900 Weissenfels was one of the largest shoe manufacturing centres in Germany with 64 factories employing some 3,200 people.

In the First World War, Reserve Infantry Regiment No. 66, which was stationed in Weißenfels, Naumburg and Altenburg, served on the Western Front, with casualties of 134 officers and 2472 other ranks killed. A war memorial featuring a huddled man was unveiled in Weissenfels in 1925, it has since been extensively damaged.

During the Weimar Republic period, city elections heavily favoured the Communist Party (KPD) and the Social Democrats (SPD). In September 1932 Weissenfels’ shoe workers went on strike for 10 days, later joined by construction workers, against wage cuts and the emergency decrees of the Papen Government. In January 1933 an “Anti-Fascist Action” rally was held in the Volkshaus, supported by the KPD, SPD and the Reichbanner (an SPD self protection group against the Nazi brownshirts), and a KPD led “united front” demonstration against the Nazis was held in the market square – the last public rally before opposition to the Nazi regime was suppressed in March.

In city council elections of March 1933 the votes cast for both the KPD and SPD were little changed from previously, but the Nazi vote increased hugely. With the four elected Communist Deputies being interned and not able to take their seats, the Nazis took control of the council. At the same time the first Nazi rallies were held in the town: a police, SA and SS parade in the castle in early March 1933 and an SA rally in the Market Square later in the month.

Under the Nazis, while the Gestapo were headquartered in the city in a house appropriated from a Jewish cattle dealer, the main police station remained in Neu-Augustusburg Castle, which also became the local Gestapo internment facility. The internment camp population grew to around 180 prisoners, primarily communists and SPD members. At this time the Nazis were keen to emphasise the ‘protective custody’ and political reeducation nature of the camp and local newspapers reported on the Weissenfels camp regularly. Between June and August 1933 the majority of detainees were transferred to the Lichtenburg concentration camp, although the castle continued to be used as a protective custody facility, including later for members of the Jewish community. Reinhard Schramm, Ich will lieben: die Juden in Weissenfels, Bohlau 2001.

In 1933 there were 165 Jews living in the city but picketing of Jewish owned shops and the forced ‘aryanisation’ of Jewish businesses, and the events of Kristallnacht led to many emigrating. Deportations began in 1940 and 38 Jewish residents of Weissenfels were murdered in the Holocaust [Amtsblatt_2019_Nummer_13]. 34 Stolperstein have been laid in the town to commemorate local Jewish victims of the Nazi regime.

In World War Two, US Forces advancing towards Leipzig arrived in Weissenfels on 13 April 1945 to unexpectedly find the city heavily defended. The US 271st Infantry Regiment and supporting tanks secured the western side of the town but the fighting continued the next day at the Castle and military barracks, where 600 prisoners of war were eventually taken. Retreating German troops having blown up the bridges over the Salle river, the US soldiers attempted to cross the river in assault boats but took heavy casualties from resistance described as ‘fanatical’. Snipers in the city continued to harass the US troops until 16 April. 15 US Infantrymen were killed in the fighting in Weissenfels.

In July 1945 the occupying American forces handed Weissenfels over to Soviet Control, and shortly afterwards much manufacturing infrastructure was removed from the city and shipped to the Soviet Union.

When the DDR was established in 1949, restoration of Weissenfels’ manufacturing capability began and in 1950 the city was designated the centre for shoe manufacture in the DDR, with a workforce that eventually grew to 5,000, many of them women. After reunification the sector declined rapidly, the last pair of shoes leaving the assembly line in 1990.

=== Population ===
Development of the city's population (from 1960 as at 31 December):

Year	Population
1825	6,423
1875	16,921
1880	19,654
1885	21,782
1890	23,779
1900	28,201
1925	35,756

Year	Population
1933	40,119
1939	42,387
1946	50,995 ¹
1950	47,967 ²
1960	45,856
1981	39,125
1984	38,657

Year	Population
1990	37,765 ³
1995	34,676
2000	31,946
2005	29,866
2006	29,669
2007	29,569
2013	39,909

Datasource since 1990: Statistical office of Saxony-Anhalt

1: 29 October
2: 31 August
3: 3 October

=== Incorporations ===
On 1 January 1995 Weißenfels absorbed the former municipality Borau. Since an administrative reform on 1 January 2010, Weißenfels also comprises the former municipalities of Langendorf, Markwerben and Uichteritz. On 1 September 2010, the former municipalities of Burgwerben, Großkorbetha, Leißling, Reichardtswerben, Schkortleben, Storkau, Tagewerben and Wengelsdorf joined the town. These 12 former municipalities are now Ortschaften or municipal divisions of Weißenfels.

== Politics ==
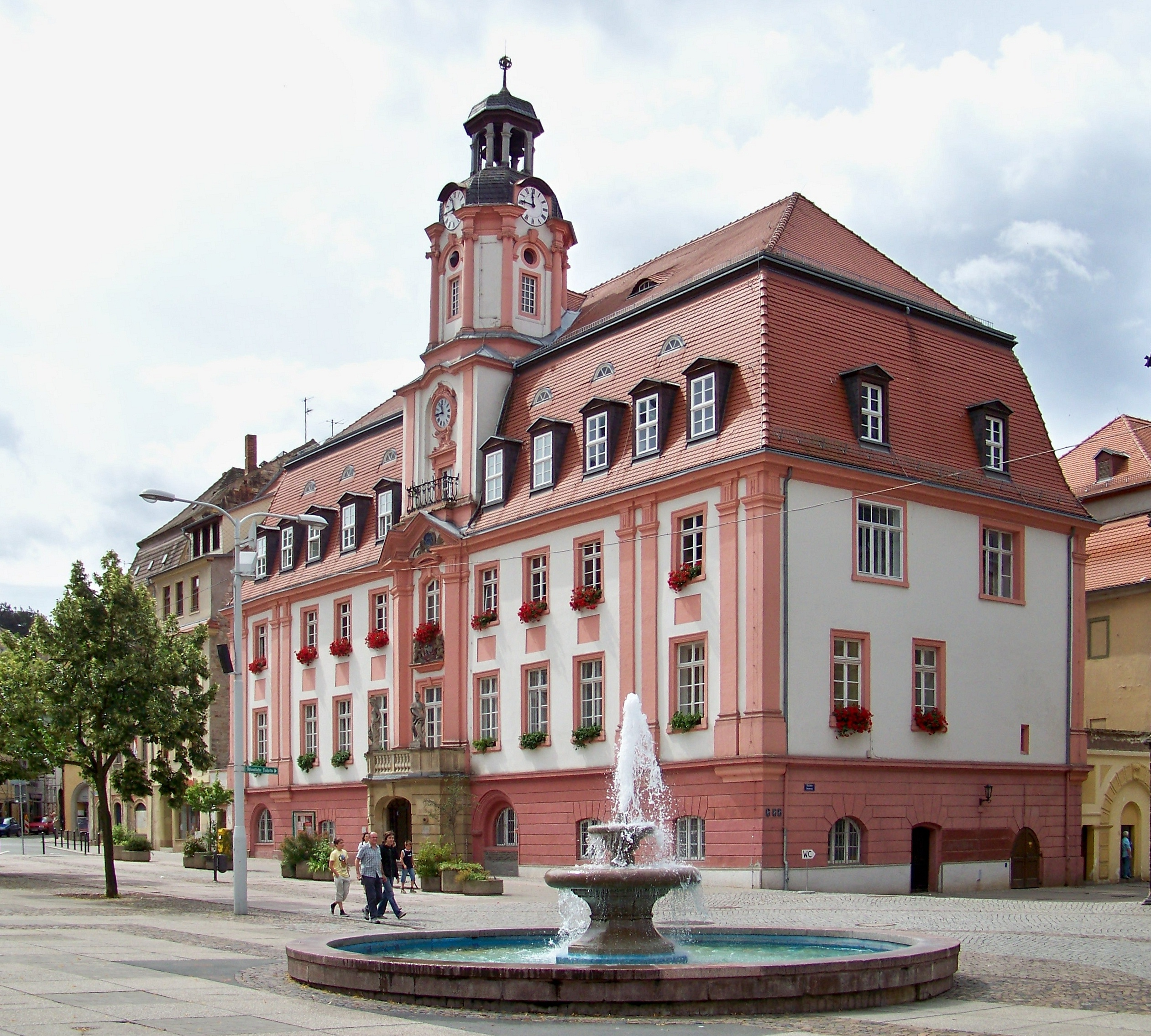
Weißenfels baroque Town hall

Seats in the municipal council (Stadtrat) as of 2014 elections:

Party/Group	Seats
Christian Democratic Union	13
Citizens for Weissenfels/Rural Neighborhoods	7
The Left	7
Social Democratic Party of Germany	6
Alliance For Justice	3
National Democratic Party of Germany	1
Alternative for Germany	1
Alliance 90/The Greens	1
Free Democratic Party	1

== Economy ==
Since the 19th century industrialisation, shoe manufacture was Weißenfels' primary industry, until 1991 when the last factory shut down. Since then, the food processing industry has grown significantly. The main companies are:

- Frischli dairy
- Tönnies Fleischwerk, Europe's third biggest meat group, runs one of its three meat-processing plants in Weißenfels
- Mitteldeutsche Erfrischungsgetränke, the third largest mineral water company of Germany, has its seat in Weißenfels. Its brands include Leißlinger Mineralwasser and Saskia-Quelle.

The town has access to the A9 at the Weißenfels junction, near the interchange with the A38. Weißenfels station is a stop on the Thuringian Railway line from Halle to Erfurt/Jena.

== Sports ==
Basketball and Unihockey are the two most popular sports in town. Mitteldeutscher Basketball Club (MBC) was playing in the German national basketball league in between 1999 and 2004 and entered the league again in 2009. Unihockey Club Kreissparkasse Weißenfels won the German Unihockey championship seven times, from 2003 to 2009. The Unihockey European Cup, organized every year in order to establish the best team in Europe, was held in Weißenfels and neighbouring cities Hohenmölsen and Merseburg in January 2004.

== Notable people ==
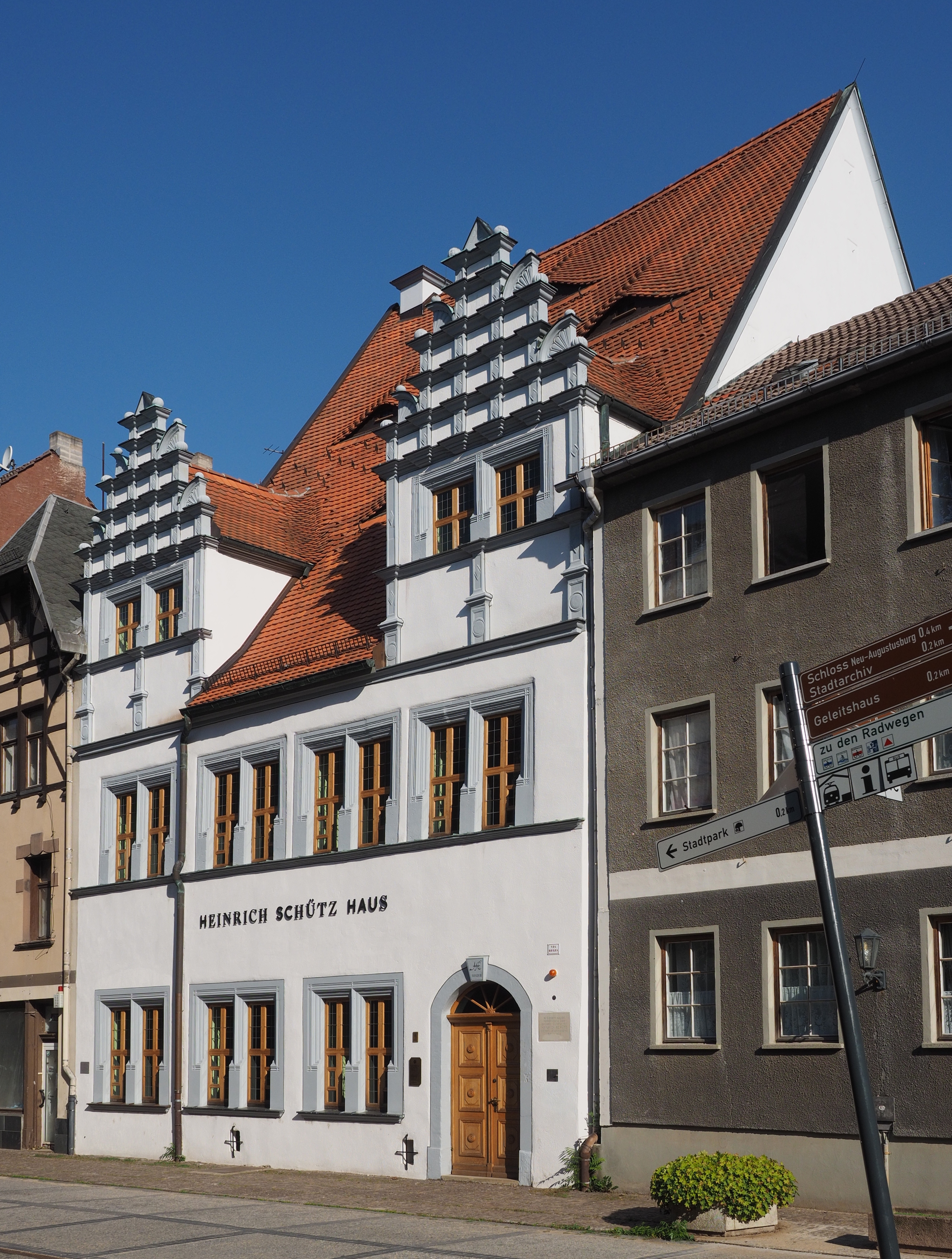
Heinrich Schütz House, the composer's home in Weißenfels, now a museum

- Heinrich Schütz (1585–1672), composer and organist
- Gottfried Reiche (1667–1734), trumpeter
- Johann Adolf II, Duke of Saxe-Weissenfels (1685–1747), Duke of Saxe-Weissenfels
- Anna Magdalena Bach (1701-1760), singer
- Joachim Wilhelm von Brawe (1738–1758), playwright
- Novalis, pen name of poet Friedrich von Hardenberg (1772–1801)
- Louise von François (1817–1893), writer
- Heinrich von Gossler (1841-1927), general
- Willy Kükenthal (1861–1922), zoologist
- Georg Kükenthal (1864–1955), botanist
- Horst P. Horst (1906–1999), photographer
- Benjamin Halevy (1910–1996), Israeli judge and politician
- Konrad Dannenberg (1912–2009), rocket scientist
- Johanna Elisabeth Döbricht (1692—1786), operatic soprano
- Hermann Eilts (1922–2006), diplomat and adviser to Kissinger on Mideast
- Gérard Tichy (1920–1992), Spanish actor
- Max Frankel (1930-2025), American journalist, Editor in Chief of the New York Times
- Theresa Emilie Henriette Winkel (1784–1867), composer

== Twin towns – sister cities ==
Weißenfels is twinned with:

- Kornwestheim, Germany (1990)
- Komárno, Slovakia (1995)

== See also ==
- Saale-Unstrut wine region
