= Die Himmel erzählen die Ehre Gottes, BWV 76 =

Church cantata by Johann Sebastian Bach

Die Himmel erzählen die Ehre Gottes
- BWV 76
- Church cantata by J. S. Bach
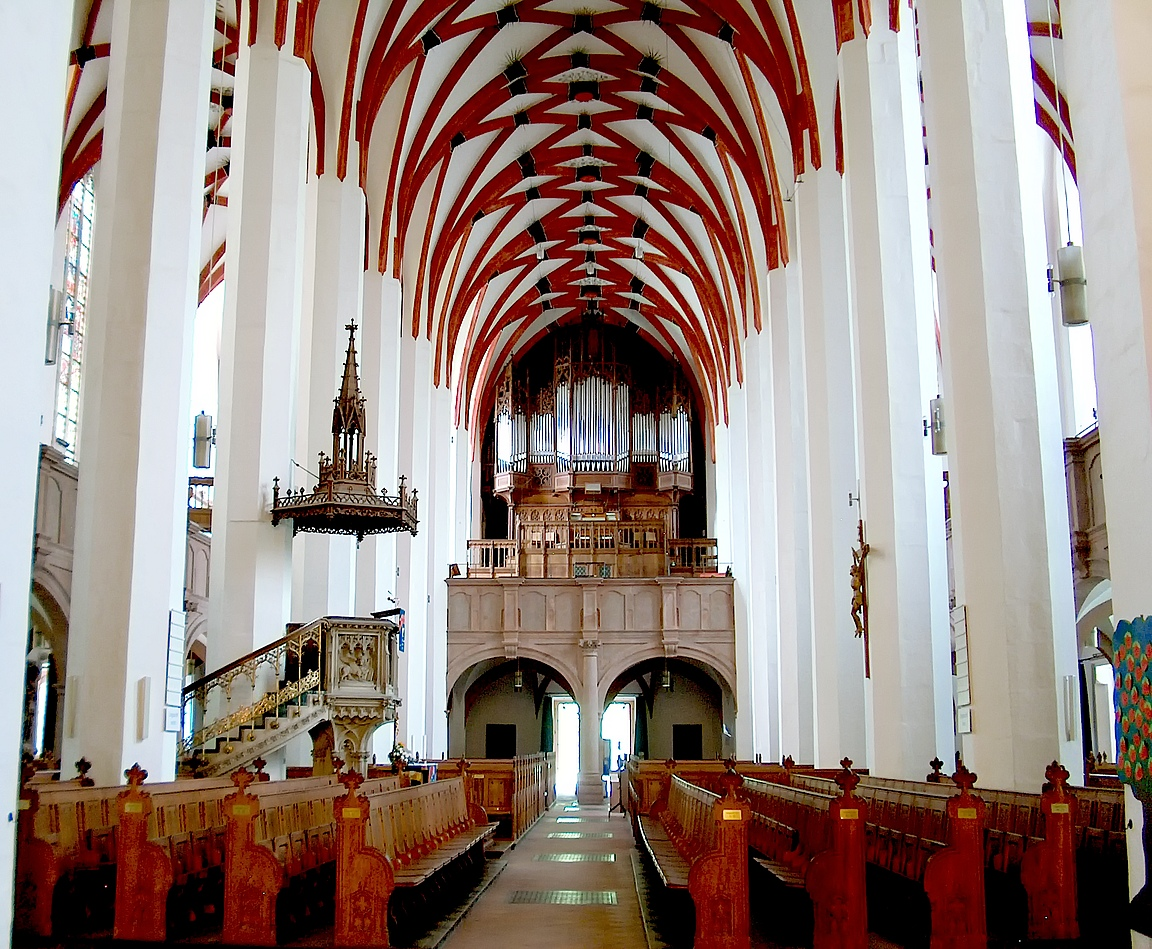
- Thomaskirche, Leipzig
- Occasion: Second Sunday after Trinity
- Cantata text: anonymous
- Bible text: Psalm 19:1,3
- Chorale: "Es woll uns Gott genädig sein"
- Performed: 6 June 1723: Leipzig
- Movements: 14 in two parts (7 + 7)
- Vocal: SATB choir and solo
- Instrumental: Trumpet; oboe; oboe d'amore; bassoon; 2 violins; viola; viola da gamba; continuo

Johann Sebastian Bach composed the church cantata Die Himmel erzählen die Ehre Gottes (English: The heavens are telling the glory of God), BWV 76 in Leipzig for the second Sunday after Trinity of the liturgical year and first performed it on 6 June 1723.

Bach composed the cantata at a decisive turning point in his career. Moving from posts in the service of churches and courts to the town of Leipzig on the first Sunday after Trinity, 30 May 1723, he began the project of composing a new cantata for every occasion of the liturgical year. He began his first annual cycle of cantatas ambitiously with Die Elenden sollen essen, BWV 75, in an unusual layout of 14 movements in two symmetrical parts, to be performed before and after the sermon. Die Himmel erzählen die Ehre Gottes, performed a week later, has the same structure.

The unknown poet begins his text with a quotation from Psalm 19 and refers to both prescribed readings from the New Testament, the parable of the great banquet as the Gospel, and the First Epistle of John. Bach scored Part I with a trumpet as a symbol of God's Glory. In Part II, performed after the sermon and during communion, he wrote chamber music with oboe d'amore and viola da gamba, dealing with "brotherly devotion". Both parts are closed with a stanza of Martin Luther's hymn "Es woll uns Gott genädig sein" (1524).

== Background ==
Johann Sebastian Bach had served in several churches as Kantor and organist, and at the courts of Weimar and Köthen, when he applied for the post of Thomaskantor in Leipzig. He was 38 years old and had a reputation as an organist and organ expert. He had composed church cantatas, notably the funeral cantata Actus tragicus around 1708. In Weimar, he had begun a project to cover all occasions of the liturgical year by providing one cantata a month for four years, including works such as Weinen, Klagen, Sorgen, Zagen, BWV 12, and Nun komm, der Heiden Heiland, BWV 61.

== History and words ==
Bach composed the cantata for the Second Sunday after Trinity and first performed it in a service in the Thomaskirche in Leipzig on 6 June 1723, a week after he took up the position as cantor in Leipzig with Die Elenden sollen essen. The cantata is similar in many respects to the earlier work. While BWV 75 was probably begun in Köthen, this cantata may have been composed in Leipzig, according to a manuscript with many corrections. The two cantatas mark the beginning of Bach's first "annual cycle": he started to compose one cantata for each Sunday and holiday of the liturgical year, a project described by Christoph Wolff as "an artistic undertaking on the largest scale".

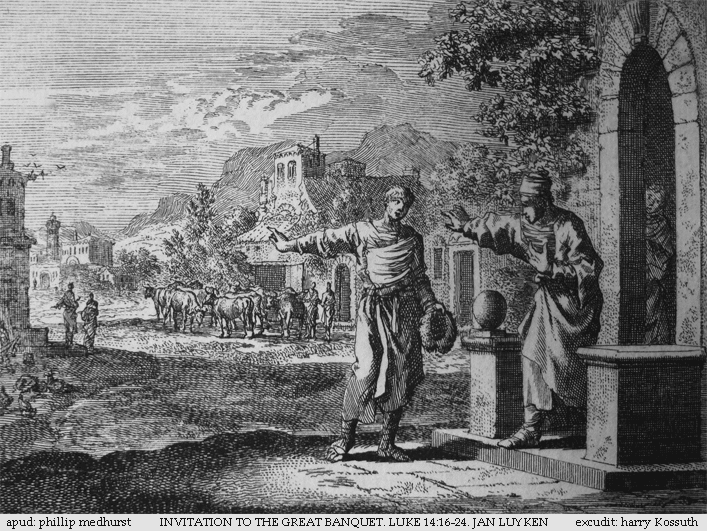
The Invitation to the Great Banquet, Jan Luyken, Bowyer Bible

The prescribed readings for the Sunday were from the First Epistle of John, "Whoever doesn't love, remains in Death" (1 John 3:13–18), and from the Gospel of Luke, the parable of the great banquet (Luke 14:16–24). The unknown poet was likely the same as for the first cantata for Leipzig, also in 14 movements, also arranged in two symmetrical parts to be performed before and after the sermon. Again the cantata begins with words from a psalm, Psalms 19:1,3 (verses 2 and 4 in the Luther Bible), "The heavens declare the glory of God, and the firmament shows His handiwork. There is no speech or language, where their voice is not heard", connecting the Gospel to the Old Testament. The poet first expands, in movements 2 and 3, the thought of the universe praising God's creation. In the following two movements he deplores, following the Gospel, that nonetheless people did not follow the invitation of God, therefore he had to invite "von allen Straßen" (from all streets) and bless those, as movement 6 says. Part I closes with the first stanza of Luther's chorale "Es woll uns Gott genädig sein" (1524), a paraphrase of Psalm 67. Part I was to be performed before the sermon, Part II after the sermon and during communion. Part II talks about the duties of those who follow God's invitation, to pass the love of Christ in order to achieve heaven on earth, a thought also expressed in the Epistle reading. The third stanza of Luther's chorale closes the work.

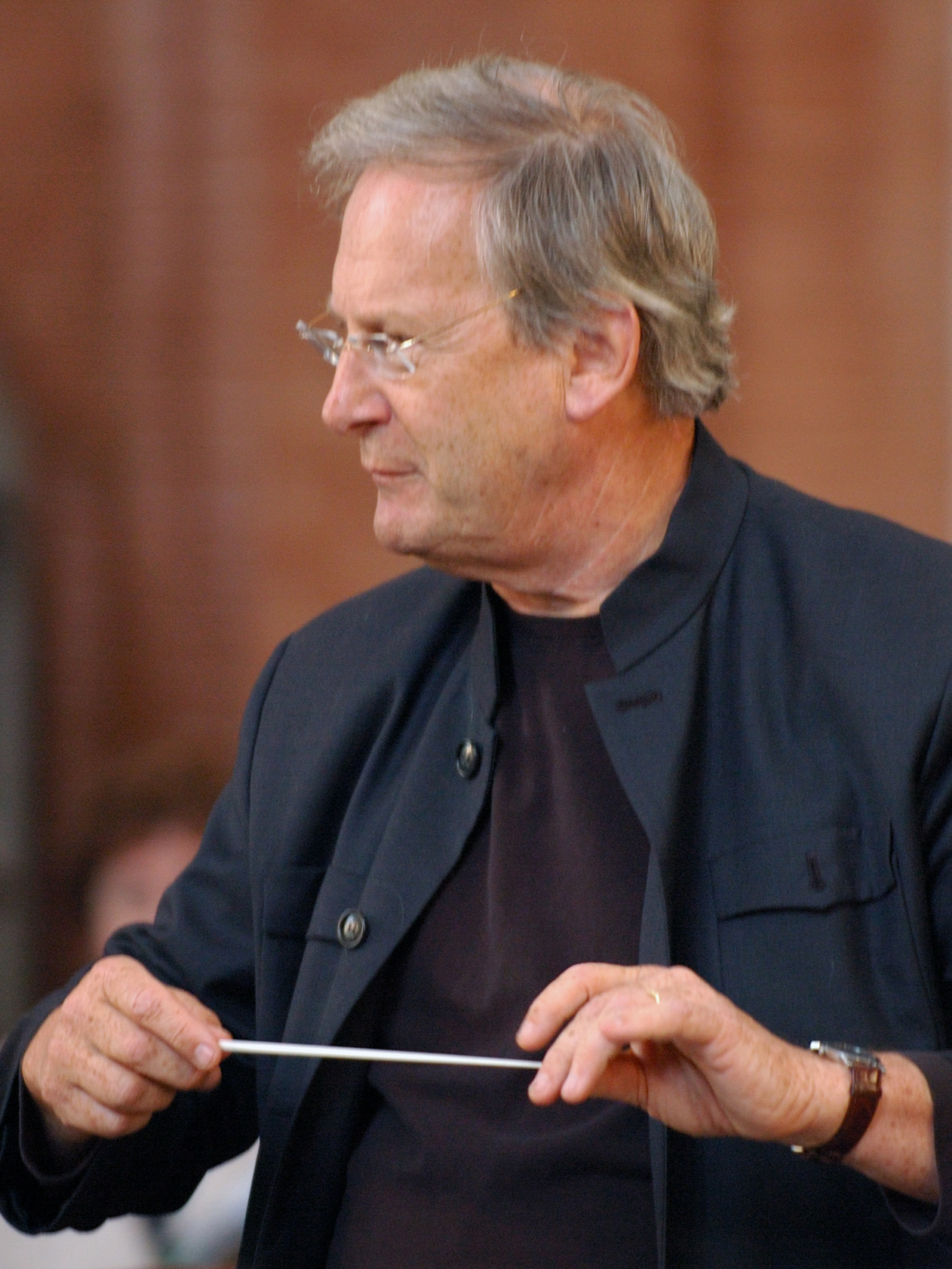
John Eliot Gardiner, 2007

John Eliot Gardiner, who conducted the Bach Cantata Pilgrimage with the Monteverdi Choir in 2000, evaluated the work, connected to Bach's first cantata for Leipzig:

this cantata is clearly more than just a sequel to the previous Sunday's Die Elenden sollen essen... together they form a diptych revealing a thematic continuity extended over two weeks, with plentiful cross-referencing between the two set Gospels and Epistles beyond the obvious parallels between the injunction to give charitably to the hungry (BWV 75) and of brotherly love manifested in action (BWV 76).

He described the works as featuring "a characteristically Lutheran interpretation" of the First Epistle of John. He also noted the depth of metaphorical uses of "eating and drinking", highlighting "the rich man's table, from which Lazarus tried to gather fallen crumbs (BWV 75), standing in opposition to the "great supper" and God's invitation through Christ to the banquet of eternal life (BWV 76)". Summarising both pieces, Gardiner wrote:

evidently a lot of thought and pre-planning had gone on while Bach was still in Köthen, as well as discussions with his unknown librettist and possibly with representatives of the Leipzig clergy, before he could set the style, tone and narrative shaping of these two impressive works.

== Music ==
=== Scoring and structure ===
The cantata is structured in two parts of seven movements each, to be performed before and after the sermon. It is scored for four vocal soloists (soprano (S), alto (A), tenor (T) and bass (B)), a four-part choir SATB, trumpet (Tr), two oboes (Ob), oboe d'amore (Oa), two violins (Vl), viola (Va), viola da gamba (Vg) and basso continuo (Bc). The two parts of seven movements each are composed as the same arrangement of alternating recitatives and arias with a concluding chorale, only Part II is opened by a sinfonia instead of a chorus. The duration is given as 35 minutes.

In the following table of the movements, the scoring follows the Neue Bach-Ausgabe. The keys and time signatures are taken from Alfred Dürr, using the symbol for common time (4/4). The instruments are shown separately for winds and strings, while the continuo, playing throughout, is not shown.

Movements of Die Himmel erzählen die Ehre Gottes – Part I
No.	Title	Text	Type	Vocal	Winds	Strings	Key	Time
1	Die Himmel erzählen die Ehre Gottes	Psalm 19:1,3	Chorus	SATB	Tr 2Ob	2Vl Va	C major	3/4
2	So lässt sich Gott nicht unbezeuget!	anon.	Recitative	T		2Vl Va		common time
3	Hört, ihr Völker, Gottes Stimme	anon.	Aria	S		Vl solo	G major	common time
4	Wer aber hört	anon.	Recitative	B				common time
5	Fahr hin, abgöttische Zunft!	anon.	Aria	B	Tr	2Vl Va	C major	common time
6	Du hast uns, Herr, von allen Straßen	anon.	Recitative	A				common time
7	Es woll uns Gott genädig sein	Luther	Chorale	SATB	Tr	2Vl Va	E minor	common time

Movements of Die Himmel erzählen die Ehre Gottes – Part II
No.	Title	Text	Type	Vocal	Winds	Strings	Key	Time
8			Sinfonia		Oa	Vg		common time
9	Gott segne noch die treue Schar	anon.	Recitative	B		2Vl Va Vg		common time
10	Hasse nur, hasse mich recht	anon.	Aria	T		Vg	A minor	3/4
11	Ich fühle schon im Geist	anon.	Recitative	A		Vg		common time
12	Liebt, ihr Christen, in der Tat!	anon.	Aria	A	Oa	Vg	E minor	9/8
13	So soll die Christenheit	anon.	Recitative	T				common time
14	Es danke, Gott, und lobe dich	Luther	Chorale	SATB	Tr	2Vl Va	E minor	common time

=== Movements ===
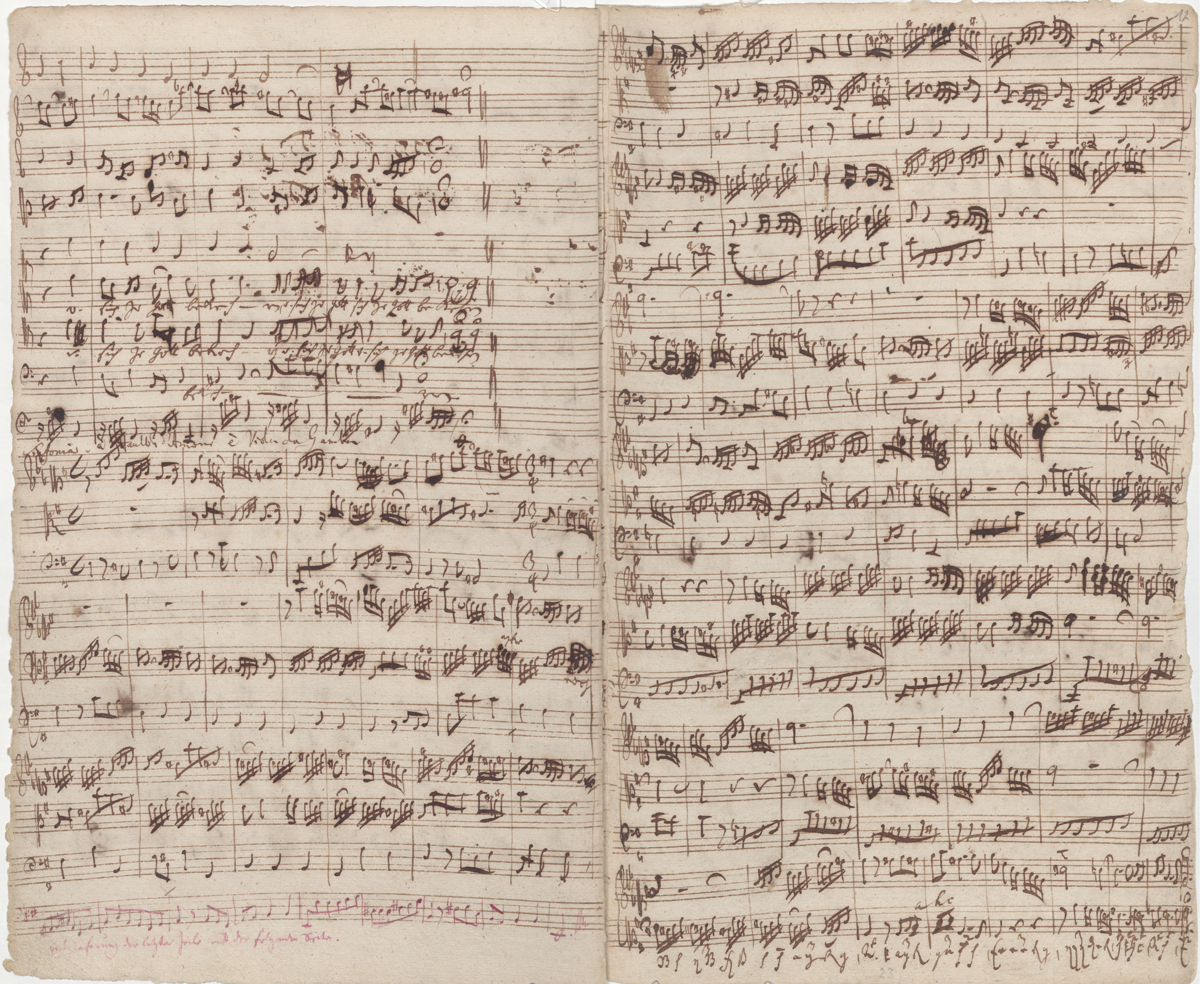
Sinfonia beginning second part of BWV 76. Autograph manuscript, 1723

Similar to the opening chorus of BWV 75, Bach sets the psalm in two sections, comparable to a prelude and fugue on a large scale. An instrumental concerto unites the complete "prelude", the trumpet "calls" to tell the glory of God. The fugue in C major is a permutation fugue, which develops the subject twice, starting with the voices, up to a triumphal entrance of the trumpet, similar in development to the first chorus of Wir danken dir, Gott, wir danken dir, BWV 29, composed much later and used twice in the Mass in B minor. Joseph Haydn later set the same words, also in C major, in his oratorio The Creation.

In the first recitative the strings accompany the voice, most keenly in motifs in the arioso middle section, in Gardiner's words "to evoke the spirit of God moving upon the face of the waters". In the second aria, trumpet and bass voice are used to convey the call "to banish the tribe of idolaters", while the strings possibly illustrate "the hordes of infidels". The last recitative leads in an arioso to the chorale. In the chorale, Bach has the violin play an obbligato part to the four-part setting of the voices and separates the lines by interludes, with the trumpet anticipating the line to follow. The continuo plays ostinato a motif which is derived from the first line of the chorale.

Whereas Part I begins with a trumpet announcing ("erzählen") God's glory, Part II starts on an intimate chamber music scale with oboe d'amore and viola da gamba, concentrating on "brotherly devotion" (brüderliche Treue). A sinfonia in E minor for these two instruments is reminiscent both of Bach's compositions for the court in Köthen and of a French overture, marked "adagio", then "vivace". Bach used the music of this movement later in his organ sonata, BWV 528. Gardiner calls the movement "in effect a sonata da chiesa". The tenor aria illustrates the "masochistic" "Hate me, then, hate me with all your might, o hostile race!" by a first dissonant entry on an ostinato bass line full of chromatic, leaps and interrupting rests. Oboe d'amore and viola da gamba return to accompany the last aria, and "the sombre qualities of both voice and instruments create a feeling of peace and introspection". The music of the closing chorale is identical to that of Part I.

== Recordings ==
A list of recordings is provided by Aryeh Oron on the Bach Cantatas Website. Ensembles playing period instruments in historically informed performance are shown with green background.

Recordings of Die Himmel erzählen die Ehre Gottes, BWV 76
Title	Conductor / Choir / Orchestra	Soloists	Label	Year	Orch. type
J. S. Bach: Cantata No. 76	Hermann Scherchen Wiener Akademie-Kammerchor Orchestra of the Vienna State Opera	Magda László; Hilde Rössel-Majdan; Petre Munteanu; Richard Standen	Westminster	1952	
Les Grandes Cantates de J.S. Bach Vol. 1	Fritz Werner Heinrich-Schütz-Chor Heilbronn Pforzheim Chamber Orchestra	Ingeborg Reichelt; Hertha Töpper; Helmut Krebs; Franz Kelch	Erato	1959	
J. S. Bach: Cantatas BWV 76 & BWV 37	Wilhelm Ehmann Westfälische Kantorei Deutsche Bachsolisten	Nelly van der Spek; Frauke Haasemann; Johannes Hoefflin; Wilhelm Pommerien	Cantate	1965	
Bach Cantatas Vol. 3 – Ascension Day, Whitsun, Trinity	Karl Richter Münchener Bach-Chor Münchener Bach-Orchester	Edith Mathis; Anna Reynolds; Peter Schreier; Kurt Moll	Archiv Produktion	1975	
J. S. Bach: Das Kantatenwerk • Complete Cantatas • Les Cantates, Folge / Vol. 20	Nikolaus Harnoncourt Tölzer Knabenchor Concentus Musicus Wien	soloist of the Tölzer Knabenchor; Paul Esswood; Kurt Equiluz; Ruud van der Meer	Teldec	1976	Period
Die Bach Kantate Vol. 18	Helmuth Rilling Gächinger Kantorei Bach-Collegium Stuttgart	Arleen Augér; Helen Watts; Adalbert Kraus; Siegmund Nimsgern	Hänssler	1978	
J. S. Bach: Complete Cantatas Vol. 6	Ton Koopman Amsterdam Baroque Orchestra & Choir	Ruth Ziesak; Elisabeth von Magnus; Paul Agnew; Klaus Mertens	Antoine Marchand	1997	Period
J. S. Bach: Cantatas Vol. 9 – (Cantatas from Leipzig 1725)	Masaaki Suzuki Bach Collegium Japan	Midori Suzuki; Robin Blaze; Gerd Türk; Peter Kooy	BIS	1998	Period
Bach Edition Vol. 20 – Cantatas Vol. 11	Pieter Jan Leusink Holland Boys Choir Netherlands Bach Collegium	Marjon Strijk; Sytse Buwalda; Knut Schoch; Bas Ramselaar	Brilliant Classics	2000	Period
Bach Cantatas Vol. 2: Paris/Zürich / For the 2nd Sunday after Trinity / For the 3rd Sunday after Trinity	John Eliot Gardiner Monteverdi Choir English Baroque Soloists	Lisa Larsson; Daniel Taylor; James Gilchrist; Stephen Varcoe	Soli Deo Gloria	2000	Period
Bach Cantates BWV 76, 79, 80 "Pour Luther"	Eric Milnes None (OVPP) Montréal Baroque	Hélène Brunet; Michael Taylor; Philippe Gagné; Jesse Blumberg	ATMA Classique	2018	Period

== Sources ==
- Die Himmel erzählen die Ehre Gottes, BWV 76: Scores at the International Music Score Library Project
- Die Himmel erzählen die Ehre Gottes BWV 76; BC A 97 / Sacred cantata (2nd Sunday after Trinity) Bach Digital
- BWV 76 Die Himmel erzählen die Ehre Gottes: English translation, University of Vermont
- BWV 76 Die Himmel erzählen die Ehre Gottes: text, scoring, University of Alberta
- Cantata No. 76, "Die Himmel erzählen die Ehre Gottes," BWV 76 (Allmusic)
- Luke Dahn: BWV 76.7=76.14 bach-chorales.com
