= Nun komm, der Heiden Heiland (disambiguation) =

"Nun komm, der Heiden Heiland" is a Lutheran hymn for Advent by Martin Luther, the translation of a Latin hymn.

Based on this hymn, the following musical pieces bear the same title:

- Nun komm, der Heiden Heiland, BWV 61, a 1714 cantata by Johann Sebastian Bach
- Nun komm, der Heiden Heiland, BWV 62, a 1724 cantata by Bach
- Nun komm, der Heiden Heiland (Böhm), a cantata by Georg Böhm
- Nun komm, der Heiden Heiland, BWV 599, a chorale prelude by Bach, included in the Orgelbüchlein
- Nun komm, der Heiden Heiland, BWV 659, a chorale prelude by Bach, included in Great Eighteen Chorale Preludes
  - "Nun komm' der Heiden Heiland", BV B 27 No. 3, piano transcription by Ferruccio Busoni of BWV 659
- Nun komm, der Heiden Heiland, BWV 660, a chorale prelude by Bach, included in the Great Eighteen Chorale Preludes
- Nun komm, der Heiden Heiland, BWV 661, a chorale prelude by Bach, included in the Great Eighteen Chorale Preludes
- Nun komm, der Heiden Heiland, BWV 699, a chorale prelude by Bach, No. 10 of the Kirnberger Collection
- "Nun komm, der Heiden Heiland", a movement of Bach's cantata Schwingt freudig euch empor, BWV 36
- Nun komm, der Heiden Heiland, a 2004 composition by George C. Baker
- Nun komm, der Heiden Heiland, a chorale prelude by Nicolaus Bruhns
- Nun komm, der Heiden Heiland, a chorale prelude by Nicolaus Vetter
- Nun komm, der Heiden Heiland, an album by amarcord

== See also ==
"Prelude" from "Nun komm der Heiden Heiland" (II), a 1963 track by the Swingle Singers from Back to Bach
