= Ubi caritas =

Christian hymn

"Ubi caritas" is a hymn of the Western Church, long used as one of the antiphons for the washing of feet on Maundy Thursday. Its text is attributed to Paulinus of Aquileia in 796 AD. The traditional melody probably also stems from the late 8th century AD. It is now and then sung at Eucharistic Adoration and Benediction of the Blessed Sacrament and has for a long time been part of the Holy Thursday evening liturgy. The current Roman Catholic Missal (1970, 3rd typical edition 2002) reassigned it from the foot-washing mandatum (or Maundy) to the offertory procession at the Holy Thursday evening Mass of the Lord's Supper. It also is found in current Anglican and Lutheran hymnals.

In the second typical edition (1975) of the current Roman Missal, the antiphonal response was altered to read "Ubi caritas est vera, Deus ibi est," after certain very early manuscripts. This translates as: "Where true charity is, God is there."

== Contemporary versions ==
In 1960, a translation, "Where Charity and Love Prevail", was copyrighted, set to the hymn tune CHRISTIAN LOVE in common metre; Dom Paul Benoit, OSB adapted this tune from the chant tune for Veni redemptor gentium. The Taizé chant by Jacques Berthier (1978) uses only the words of the refrain, with verses taken from I Corinthians 13:2-8. Maurice Duruflé's choral setting makes use of the Gregorian melody, using only the words of the refrain and the first stanza. Paul Halley combined phrases of the original chant melody sung in Latin with other songs in the track "Ubi caritas" on his 1991 album Angel on a Stone Wall.

More recent versions of the hymn for choir have been composed by David Conte, Stephen DeCesare, Ola Gjeilo and Paul Mealor. Mealor's setting was included in the ceremony at the 2011 Wedding of Prince William and Catherine Middleton.

== Text and translation ==
(Ant.) Ubi cáritas et amor, Deus ibi est.

Congregávit nos in unum Christi amor.
Exsultémus et in ipso iucundémur.
Timeámus et amémus Deum vivum.
Et ex corde diligámus nos sincéro.

Ubi cáritas et amor, Deus ibi est.

Simul ergo cum in unum congregámur:
Ne nos mente dividámur, caveámus.
Cessent iúrgia malígna, cessent lites.
Et in médio nostri sit Christus Deus.

Ubi cáritas et amor, Deus ibi est.

Simul quoque cum beátis videámus
Gloriánter vultum tuum, Christe Deus:
Gáudium, quod est imménsum atque probum.
Sæcula per infiníta sæculórum. Amen.

(Ant.) Where charity and love are, God is there.

The love of Christ has gathered us into one.
Let us rejoice and be glad in Him.
Let us fear and love the living God.
And from a sincere heart let us love one another.

Where charity and love are, God is there.

Therefore, when we are gathered together as one:
Let us take care that we be not divided in mind.
Let malicious quarrels cease, let strife cease.
And in our midst may Christ God be.

Where charity and love are, God is there.

Also, together with the blessed, may we see
Gloriously Your face, O Christ God:
A joy which is immense and pure.
For endless ages of ages. Amen.

== Music ==
- Maurice Duruflé set the prayer in Latin as No. 1 of his Quatre Motets sur des thèmes grégoriens.
- Ola Gjeilo and Paul Mealor have set the prayer to a SATB choir piece.
- Rene Clausen has set the Ubi Caritas text to an SATB choral piece.
- Patrick O'Shea has set the Ubi Caritas text as an SATB choral piece with piano.
- Bob Hurd, along with Pedro Rubalcava, has set the Ubi Caritas text as a SATB piece, in a blend of English (Spanish translation by Rubalcava) and Latin.
- Dan Forrest has set the Ubi Caritas text for either SATB or SSAA, with piano and strings.
- Craig Courtney has set the Ubi Caritas text for SATB with clarinet.

== See also ==
- "Where Love Is, God Is", the story by Tolstoy
