= Christ unser Herr zum Jordan kam =

Lutheran hymn about baptism by Martin Luther

"Christ, unser Herr, zum Jordan kam"
- Hymn by Martin Luther
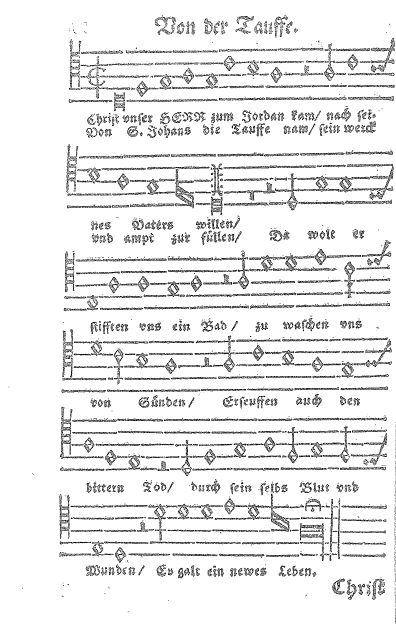
- The hymn in a 1577 edition of Luther's hymnbook
- English: "To Jordan came our Lord, the Christ"
- Catalogue: Zahn 7246
- Written: 1541
- Text: by Martin Luther
- Language: German
- Melody: by Johann Walter
- Published: 1524 (tune); 1543 (text)

"Christ unser Herr zum Jordan kam" ("Christ our Lord came to the Jordan") is a Lutheran hymn about baptism by Martin Luther, written in 1541 and published in 1543. It has been set in many musical compositions, including cantatas and chorale preludes by Johann Sebastian Bach.

== History of the hymn text ==
Luther wrote the hymn focused on baptism as part of his teaching about Lutheran concepts, possibly as the last hymn he wrote. Luther held sermons about baptism in the Easter week of 1540; it seems likely that he wrote the hymn in that context. It is closely connected to Luther's teaching about baptism in his Small Catechism, reflecting the structure of his questions and answers.

Several later publications refer to the year 1541 as a first publication as a broadsheet, which did not survive. The hymn appeared in 1543, summarized "A Spiritual Song of our Holy Baptism, which is a fine summary of What it is? Who established it? What are its benefits?" ("Ein Geistlich Lied von unser heiligen Tauffe, darin fein kurtz gefasset, was sie sey? Wer sie gestifftet habe? Was sie nütze?"). In the Lutheran liturgy, the hymn was related to the feast day of John the Baptist. In the current Protestant hymnal, Evangelisches Gesangbuch, it appears as EG 202.

== Melody ==
The hymn tune, Zahn No. 7246, in the Dorian mode, is older than the text and appeared already in 1524 in Johann Walter's choral hymnal Eyn geystlich Gesangk Buchleyn with the hymn "Es wolle Gott uns gnädig sein" (a paraphrase of Psalm 67). When Luther looked for a melody for the new baptism hymn, "Es wolle Gott uns gnädig sein" was already assigned a different melody. It made sense to use a tune for a hymn about God's grace for a specific expression of that grace in baptism. Walter revised the four-part setting from 1524 with the melody in the tenor, adapting it to the different text. It was published in 1550.

Below is the melody first published in 1524:

== Text ==
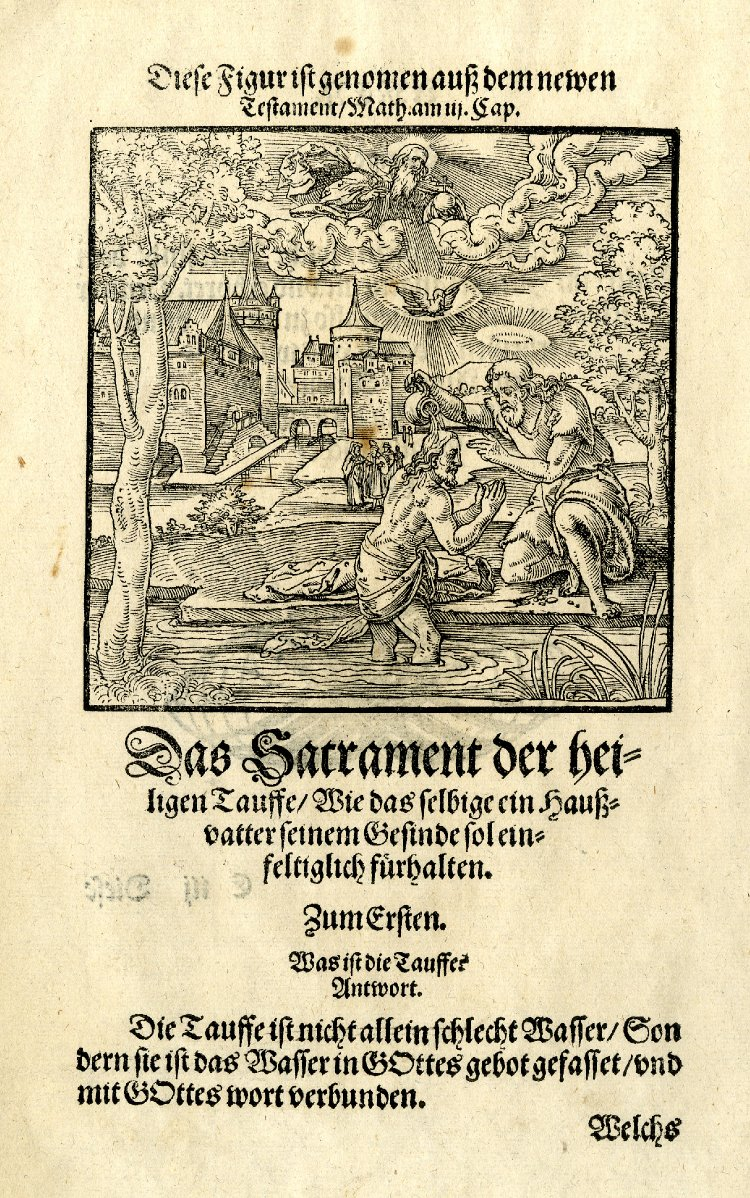
The Baptism of Christ from Luther's Small Catechism, 1550

Below is the text of Luther's hymn with the English translation by George Macdonald.

1 Christ unser Herr zum Jordan kam nach seines Vaters Willen, von Sanct Johann die Taufe nahm, sein Werk und Amt zu 'rfüllen, Da wollt er stiften uns ein Bad, zu waschen uns von Sünden, ersaüfen auch den bittern Tod durch sein selbst Blut und Wunden; es galt ein neues Leben. 2 So hört und merket alle wohl, Was Gott heißt selbst die Taufe, Und was ein Christen glauben soll, Zu meiden Ketzer Haufen: Gott spricht und will, das Wasser sei Doch nicht allein schlecht Wasser, Sein heilig's Wort ist auch dabei Mit reichem Geist ohn' Massen, Der ist allhie der Täufer. 3 Solch's hat er uns beweiset klar, Mit Bildern und mit Worten, Des Vaters Stimm man offenbar Daselbst am Jordan hörte. Er sprach: das ist mein lieber Sohn, An dem ich hab' Gefallen, Den will ich euch befohlen han, Daß ihr ihn höret alle Und folget seinen Lehren. 4 Auch Gottes Sohn hie selber steht In seiner zarten Menschheit, Der heilig' Geist hernieder fährt In Taubenbild verkleidet; Daß wir nicht sollen zweifeln d'ran, Wenn wir getaufet werden, All' drei Person getaufet han, Damit bei uns auf Erden Zu wohnen sich ergeben. 5 Sein' Jünger heißt der Herre Christ: Geht hin all' Welt zu lehren, Daß sie verlor'n in Sünden ist, Sich soll zur Busse kehren; Wer glaubet und sich taufen läßt, Soll dadurch selig werden, Ein neugeborner Mensch er heißt, Der nicht mehr konne sterben, Das Himmelreich soll erben. 6 Wer nicht glaubt dieser großen G'nad, Der bleibt in seinen Sünden, Und ist verdammt zum ew'gen Tod Tief in der Höllen Grunde, Nichts hilst sein' eigen' Heiligkeit, All' sein Thun ist verloren. Die Erbsünd' macht's zur Nichtigkeit, Darin er ist geboren, Vermag ihm selbst nichts helfen. 7 Das Aug allein das Wasser sieht, wie Menschen Wasser gießen; der Glaub im Geist die Kraft versteht des Blutes Jesu Christi; und ist vor ihm ein rote Flut, von Christi Blut gefärbet, die allen Schaden heilen tut, von Adam her geerbet, auch von uns selbst begangen.	To Jordan when our Lord had gone, His Father's pleasure willing, He took His baptism of St John, His work and task fulfilling; Therein He would appoint a bath To wash us from defilement, And also drown that cruel Death In His blood of assoilment: 'Twas no less than a new life. Let all then hear and right receive The baptism of the Father, And what a Christian shall believe To shun where heretics gather. Water indeed, not water mere In it can do His pleasure, His holy Word is also there With Spirit rich, unmeasured: He is the one baptizer. This clearly He to us by word Hath shown, nor less by vision; The Father's voice men plainly heard At Jordan tell His mission. He said, This is My own dear Son, In Whom I am well contented: To you I send Him, every one — That you may hear, I have sent Him, And follow what He teaches, Also God's Son Himself here stands In His humanity tender; The Holy Ghost on Him descends, In dove's appearance hidden. That not a doubt should ever rise That, when we are baptized. All the three Persons do baptize; And so, here recognized, Themselves give to dwell with us. Christ to His scholars says : Go forth, Give to all men acquaintance That lost in sin lies the whole earth, And must turn to repentance. Who trusts, and is baptized, each one Is thereby blest for ever, Is from that hour a new-born man, And, thenceforth dying never, The kingdom shall inherit. But in this grace who puts no faith Abides in his trespasses, And is condemned to endless death. Deep down in hell's abysses. Nothing avails his righteousness. And lost are all his merits; The old sin than nothing makes them less — The sin which he inherits; And help himself he cannot. The eye but water doth behold, As from man's hand it floweth; But inward faith the power untold Of Jesus Christ's blood knoweth. Faith sees therein a red flood roll, With Christ's blood dyed and blended, Which hurts of all kinds maketh whole, From Adam here descended, And by ourselves brought on us.

== Use in musical compositions ==
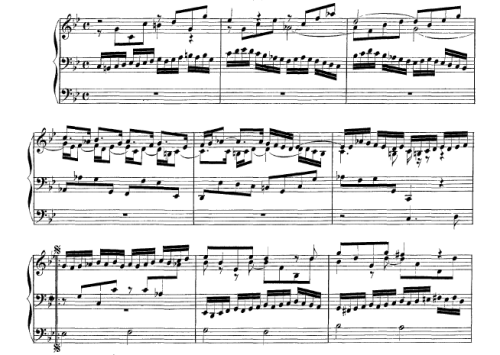
Beginning of Bach's chorale prelude BWV 684

The hymn has been set in many choral and organ compositions. A four-part setting by Wolf Heintz was used to introduce the Reformation in Halle in 1541. Choral settings include works by Hans Leo Hassler, Johann Hermann Schein and Samuel Scheidt; while organ settings include a Ricercar by Michael Praetorius and chorale preludes by Hieronymus Praetorius, Dieterich Buxtehude (BuxWV 180) and Johann Pachelbel.

Johann Sebastian Bach composed the chorale cantata Christ unser Herr zum Jordan kam, BWV 7, for Johannistag, the feast day of John the Baptist. The last verse of the hymn is the closing chorale of cantata Es ist ein trotzig und verzagt Ding, BWV 176. The melody was also used as the cantus firmus of two chorale preludes for organ in his Clavier-Übung III: BWV 684, a four-part setting for two manuals and pedal; and BWV 685 for single manual.
