= Christ unser Herr zum Jordan kam, BWV 7 =

Church cantata by Johann Sebastian Bach

Christ unser Herr zum Jordan kam
- BWV 7
- Chorale cantata by J. S. Bach
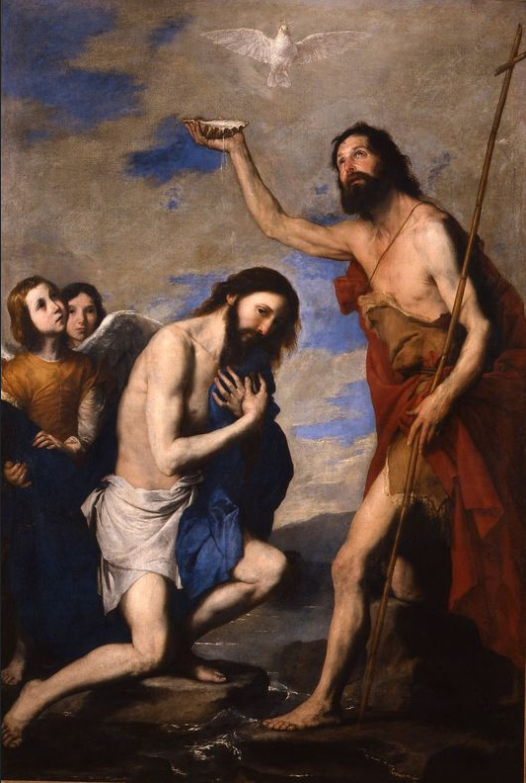
- Baptism of Jesus (topic of the chorale) by José de Ribera, 1643
- English: Christ our Lord came to the Jordan
- Occasion: Feast of St John the Baptist
- Chorale: "Christ unser Herr zum Jordan kam" by Martin Luther
- Performed: 24 June 1724: Leipzig
- Movements: 7
- Vocal: SATB choir; solo: alto, tenor and bass
- Instrumental: 2 oboes d'amore; 2 violins; viola; continuo

Christ unser Herr zum Jordan kam (Christ our Lord came to the Jordan), BWV 7, is one of several church cantatas which Johann Sebastian Bach composed for the Feast of St. John the Baptist. He wrote it in Leipzig and led its first performance on 24 June 1724.

It is the third cantata Bach composed for his chorale cantata cycle, the second cantata cycle he started after being appointed Thomaskantor in 1723. The cantata is based on the seven stanzas of Martin Luther's hymn "Christ unser Herr zum Jordan kam", about baptism. The first and last stanza of the chorale were used for the outer movements of the cantata, while an unknown librettist paraphrased the inner stanzas of the hymn into the text for the five other movements. The first movement, a chorale fantasia, is followed by a succession of arias alternating with recitatives, leading to a four-part closing chorale.

The cantata is scored for three vocal soloists (alto, tenor and bass), a four-part choir, two oboes d'amore, two solo violins, strings and continuo.

== History and words ==
Bach composed Christ unser Herr zum Jordan kam for St. John's Day, 24 June 1724, in Leipzig, as the third cantata of his second annual cycle, the chorale cantata cycle, which had begun about two weeks earlier on the first Sunday after Trinity. The cycle was devoted to Lutheran hymns, in the format of his chorale cantatas rendered by retaining their text of the first and last stanza, while a contemporary poet reworded the inner stanzas.

The prescribed readings for the feast of the birth of John the Baptist were from the Book of Isaiah, "the voice of a preacher in the desert" (Isaiah 40:1–5), and from the Gospel of Luke, the birth of John the Baptist and the Benedictus of Zechariah (Luke 1:57–80). Martin Luther's hymn "Christ unser Herr zum Jordan kam" (To Jordan came our Lord the Christ) is associated with the feast. Its topic, differing from that of the readings, is baptism, which is treated based on biblical accounts, starting from Christ's baptism by John the Baptist in the river Jordan. The hymn tune is "Es woll uns Gott genädig sein", Zahn No. 7246.

Bach used the text of the first stanza of Luther's hymn for the first movement of his cantata, with its chorale melody sung as cantus firmus. The final movement of the cantata is a four-part chorale setting of the seventh stanza, on the hymn tune. The five arias and recitatives between these choral movements are settings of text paraphrased from the hymn's other stanzas.

Bach led the first performance on 24 June 1724.

== Music ==
=== Scoring and structure ===
Bach structured the cantata in seven movements and scored it for three vocal soloists (alto (A), tenor (T) and bass (B)), a four-part choir (SATB), two oboes d'amore (Oa), two solo violins (Vs, the second one only introduced in a later performance), two violins (Vl), viola (Va) and basso continuo (Bc).

In the following table of the movements, the scoring and keys and time signatures are taken from Alfred Dürr, using the symbol for common time (4/4). The instruments are shown separately for winds and strings, while the continuo, playing throughout, is not shown.

Movements of Christ unser Herr zum Jordan kam
No.	Title	Text	Type	Vocal	Winds	Strings	Key	Time
1	Christ unser Herr zum Jordan kam	Luther	Chorus	SATB	2Oa	Vs 2Vl Va	E minor	common time
2	Merkt und hört, ihr Menschenkinder	anon.	Aria	B			G major	common time
3	Dies hat Gott klar mit Worten	anon.	Recitative	T				
4	Des Vaters Stimme ließ sich hören	anon.	Aria	T		2Vs	A minor	9/8
5	Als Jesus dort nach seinen Leiden	anon.	Recitative	B		2Vl Va		
6	Menschen, glaubt doch dieser Gnade	anon.	Aria	A	2Oa (unis.)	2Vl Va	G major	common time
7	Das Aug allein das Wasser sieht	Luther	Chorale	SATB	2Oa	2Vl Va	E minor; B minor	common time

=== Movements ===
The seven-movement cantata begins with a chorale fantasia and ends, after a sequence of alternating arias and recitatives, with a closing chorale as a four-part setting. Bach increased the number of accompanying instruments for the arias, from only continuo in the second movement, over two solo violins in the central movement of the cantata, to two oboes d'amore and strings in the sixth movement.

==== 1 ====
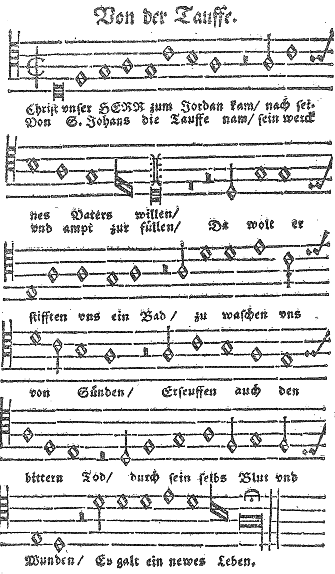
The hymn in a print of 1577

In the opening chorus, "Christ unser Herr zum Jordan kam" (Christ our Lord came to the Jordan), the tenor has the melody as a cantus firmus, while the other voices sing free counterpoint. In the first cantata of the chorale cantata cycle, O Ewigkeit, du Donnerwort, BWV 20, Bach had given the cantus firmus of the chorale tune to the soprano, and in the second, Ach Gott, vom Himmel sieh darein, BWV 2, to the alto.

The opening chorus resembles an Italian violin concerto, although in the context of a single movement rather than the three-movement format favoured by composers such as Vivaldi. Bach had studied Italian composers from 1714 onwards, when working in Weimar. He went on to assimilate the Italian style into his own compositions (the violin concerto in A minor, BWV 1041 is another example). Alfred Dürr compares the vocal sections of the chorus, all with the solo violin, to the solo sections of a violin concerto, as opposed to the tutti sections with the orchestra. The musicologist Julian Mincham likened the "solo violin's persistent, rocking, wave-like idea" to the waves of the Jordan River. Klaus Hofmann notes that the movement combines the old style of motet writing with the new type of solo concerto, and observes that "the main violin solo episodes ... are at first linked to the choral entries, but gradually assume larger proportions and greater independence as the movement progresses". John Eliot Gardiner sees a French influence in the movement, interpreting it as a French overture, "replete with grandiloquent baroque gestures to suggest both the processional entrance of Jesus and the powerful flooding of the River Jordan".

==== 2 ====
The first aria, "Merkt und hört, ihr Menschenkinder" (Mark and hear, you humans), is accompanied by the continuo alone. Mincham observes that a characteristic fast motif of five notes, repeated abundantly in the cello, always flows downward, while Bach usually also inverses motifs, such as in his Inventions. Mincham concludes that it represents the "pouring of the baptismal waters".

==== 3 ====
The following recitative is given to the tenor as an Evangelist: "Dies hat Gott klar mit Worten" (This God has clearly provided with words), narrating the biblical command to baptise.

==== 4 ====
The central aria is sung by the tenor, accompanied by two violins, marked "solo" in a later performance, "Des Vaters Stimme ließ sich hören" (The Father's voice can be heard). Gardiner notes that the music "describes, through its pair of soaring violins, the circling flight of the Holy Spirit as a dove". Hofmann notes the character of the movement as a gigue, and several appearances of the number 3 as a symbol of the Trinity: it is a trio for voice and two violins, "in triple time – and markedly so: not only is the time signature 3/4, but also the crotchets are each divided into triplets", and in a form of three solo sections as "all variants of a single model that is presented in the opening and concluding ritornellos". Hofmann concludes: "The sequence that this creates – three different forms of the same musical substance – is evidently to be understood as a symbol of the Holy Trinity."

==== 5 ====
A recitative for bass, the vox Christi (voice of Christ), "Als Jesus dort nach seinen Leiden" (As Jesus there, after His passion), speaks of Jesus after his passion and resurrection. It is accompanied by the strings, similar to the words of Jesus in Bach's St Matthew Passion.

==== 6 ====
The last aria is sung by the alto with rich accompaniment: "Menschen, glaubt doch dieser Gnade" (People, believe this grace now). The two oboes d'amore double the first violin when human beings are requested to accept the grace of God to not "perish in the pit of hell".

==== 7 ====
The closing chorale is the final stanza of the hymn, with the instruments playing colla parte: "Das Aug allein das Wasser sieht" (The eye sees only water), a summary of Luther's teaching about baptism.

== Editions ==
In 1851, about a century before the cantata was assigned its BWV number, it was published as No. 7 in the first volume of the Bach-Gesellschaft-Ausgabe. The editor was Moritz Hauptmann. In the New Bach Edition the cantata was included in Series I, Volume 29, Kantaten zum Johannisfest (Cantatas for St. John's Day) along with BWV 30 and BWV 167. Calmus and Breitkopf & Härtel published performance scores. The Breitkopf score translates the cantata's title as Lord Christ of old to Jordan came.

== Recordings ==
A list of recordings is provided on the Bach Cantatas Website. Ensembles playing period instruments in historically informed performance are shown with green background.

Recordings of Christ unser Herr zum Jordan kam
Title	Conductor / Choir / Orchestra	Soloists	Label	Year	Orch. type
Les Grandes Cantates de J. S. Bach Vol. 22	Fritz Werner Heinrich-Schütz-Chor Heilbronn Pforzheim Chamber Orchestra	Barbara Scherler; Georg Jelden; Jakob Stämpfli	Erato	1966	
J. S. Bach: Das Kantatenwerk • Complete Cantatas • Les Cantates, Folge / Vol. 2	Gustav Leonhardt Choir of King's College, Cambridge Leonhardt-Consort	Paul Esswood; Kurt Equiluz; Max van Egmond	Teldec	1971	Period
Die Bach Kantate Vol. 40	Helmuth Rilling Gächinger Kantorei Bach-Collegium Stuttgart	Helen Watts; Adalbert Kraus; Wolfgang Schöne	Hänssler	1976	
Bach Edition Vol. 9 – Cantatas Vol. 4	Pieter Jan Leusink Holland Boys Choir Netherlands Bach Collegium	Sytse Buwalda; Nico van der Meel; Bas Ramselaar	Brilliant Classics	1999	Period
J. S. Bach: Complete Cantatas Vol. 11	Ton Koopman Amsterdam Baroque Orchestra & Choir	Annette Markert; Christoph Prégardien; Klaus Mertens	Antoine Marchand	1999	Period
Bach Cantatas Vol. 1: Long Melford For Whit Sunday For Whit Monday	John Eliot Gardiner Monteverdi Choir English Baroque Soloists	Nathalie Stutzmann; Christoph Genz; Panajotis Iconomou	Soli Deo Gloria	2000	Period
J. S. Bach: Cantatas Vol. 22 (Cantatas from Leipzig 1724)	Masaaki Suzuki Bach Collegium Japan	Robin Blaze; Jan Kobow; Peter Kooy	BIS	2002	Period
