= Nun komm, der Heiden Heiland, BWV 61 =

Church cantata by Johann Sebastian Bach

Nun komm, der Heiden Heiland
- BWV 61
- Church cantata by J. S. Bach
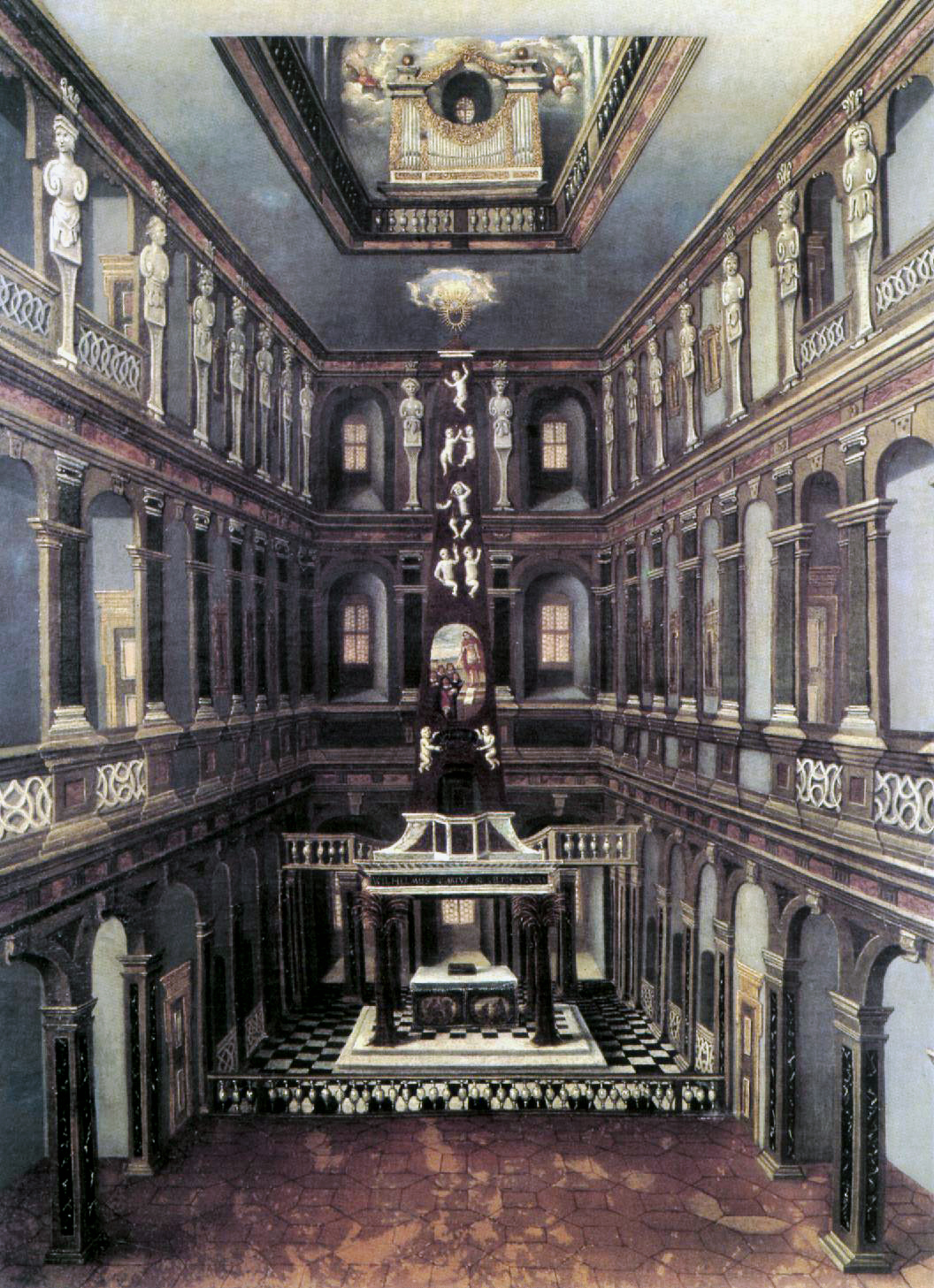
- The Schlosskirche in Weimar
- Occasion: First Sunday in Advent
- Cantata text: Erdmann Neumeister
- Bible text: Revelation 3:20
- Chorale: "Nun komm, der Heiden Heiland" by Martin Luther; "Wie schön leuchtet der Morgenstern" by Philipp Nicolai
- Performed: 2 December 1714: Weimar
- Movements: 6
- Vocal: SATB choir; solo: soprano, tenor and bass
- Instrumental: 2 violins; 2 violas; continuo

Johann Sebastian Bach composed the church cantata Nun komm, der Heiden Heiland (Now come, Savior of the heathens), BWV 61, in Weimar for the first Sunday in Advent, the Sunday which begins the liturgical year, and first performed it there on 2 December 1714.

The cantata text was provided by Erdmann Neumeister, who quoted the Book of Revelation and framed his work by two hymn stanzas, the beginning of Martin Luther's "Nun komm, der Heiden Heiland", the main hymn for Advent with a melody based on Medieval chant, and the end from Philipp Nicolai's "Wie schön leuchtet der Morgenstern". The librettist developed his thoughts like a sermon. Bach structured the cantata in six movements, beginning with a chorale fantasia, followed by a series of alternating recitatives and arias, and concluded by a four-part chorale. He scored it for three vocal soloists (soprano, tenor and bass), strings and continuo. Bach led the first performance on 2 December 1714. As Thomaskantor, director of music of the main churches of Leipzig, he performed the cantata again on 28 November 1723.

== History and words ==
On 2 March 1714 Bach was appointed concertmaster of the Weimar court capelle of the co-reigning dukes Wilhelm Ernst and Ernst August of Saxe-Weimar. As concertmaster, he assumed the principal responsibility for composing new works, specifically cantatas for the Schlosskirche (palace church), on a monthly schedule.

The exact chronological order of Bach's Weimar cantatas remains uncertain. Only four bear autograph dates. BWV 61 is dated 1714, with the liturgical designation "am ersten Advent", the First Sunday of Advent. The prescribed readings for the Sunday were from the Epistle to the Romans, "now is our salvation nearer" (Romans 13:11–14), and from the Gospel of Matthew, the Entry into Jerusalem (Matthew 21:1–9).

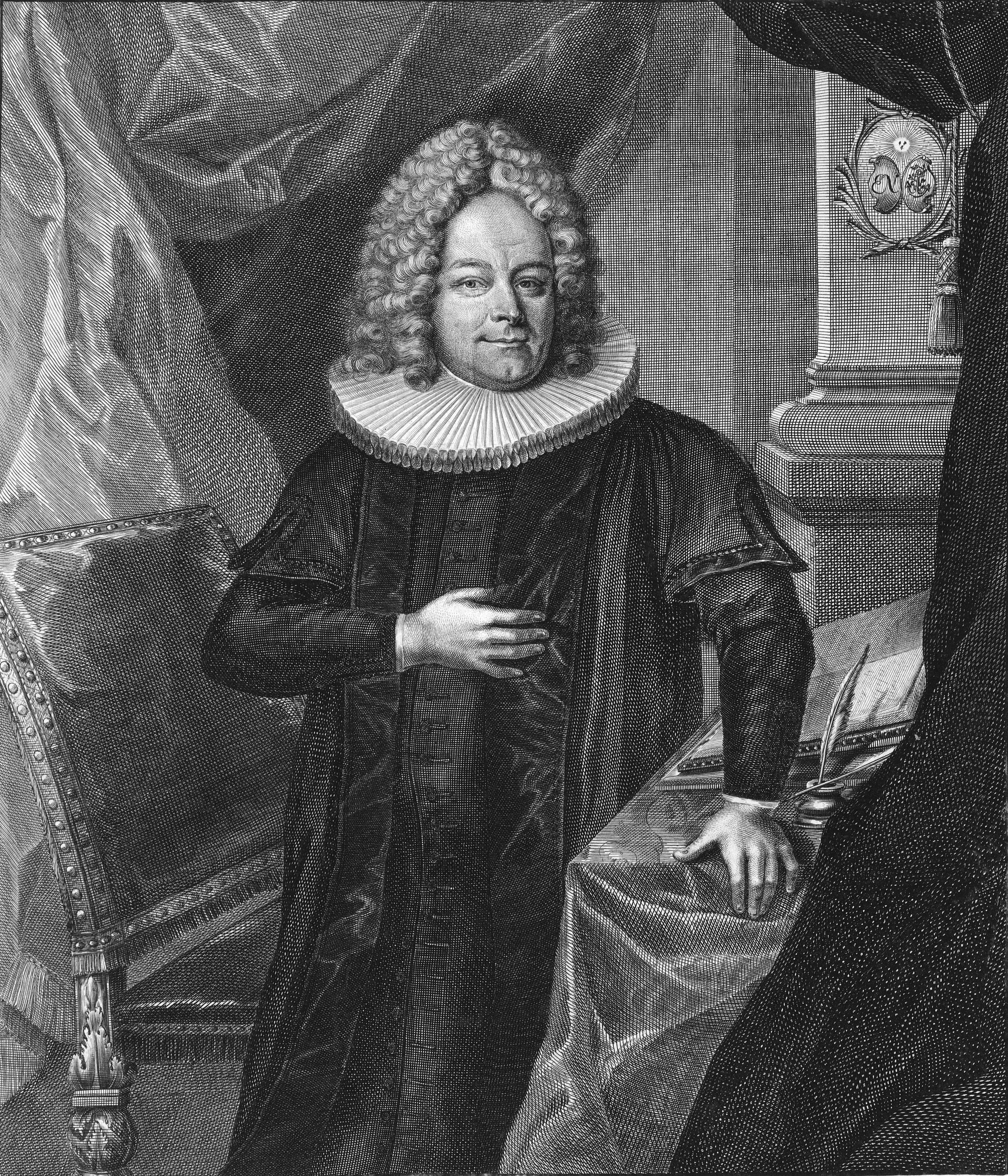
Erdmann Neumeister, the librettist

The cantata text was provided by Erdmann Neumeister, published in Geistliche Poesien in Frankfurt in 1714. He began and ended his work with a hymn stanza. "Nun komm, der Heiden Heiland" is the main hymn for Advent, which Martin Luther had derived from the Latin Veni redemptor gentium. Its melody is based on Medieval chant and supplies a "dark, imposing character". For the conclusion, Neumeister chose the second part, the Abgesang, of the seventh and final stanza of Philipp Nicolai's "Wie schön leuchtet der Morgenstern". The librettist quoted the Book of Revelation in the fourth movement: "Siehe, ich stehe vor der Tür und klopfe an. So jemand meine Stimme hören wird und die Tür auftun, zu dem werde ich eingehen und das Abendmahl mit ihm halten und er mit mir." – "Behold, I stand at the door and knock. Anyone that hears My voice and opens the door, to him I will enter and keep the evening meal with him and he with me." (Revelation 3:20). The poet combined the ideas of Jesus' entry into Jerusalem and his promise to return with an invitation to enter the heart of the individual Christian. He developed his thoughts like a sermon, as the Bach scholar Alfred Dürr notes: mentioning that the arrival of Jesus brings blessing every day (movement 2), a prayer that Jesus may come to his congregation (movement 2), and in response to his statement of being at the door (movement 4) the opening of the heart of the individual Christian who knows about his sinfulness (movement 5). Bach had set one text by Neumeister before, possibly by 1713, in his cantata Gleichwie der Regen und Schnee vom Himmel fällt, BWV 18.

Because of Bach's liturgical designation, the performance can be precisely dated to 2 December 1714. As Thomaskantor, director of music of the main churches of Leipzig, Bach performed the cantata again on 28 November 1723, beginning the first liturgical year in the new position. Bach paid attention to the exceptional occasion at beginning of the liturgical year, also when he composed later the chorale cantata Nun komm, der Heiden Heiland, BWV 62 (1724), and Schwingt freudig euch empor, BWV 36 (1731), which are all inspired by Luther's hymn. Bach also began his Orgelbüchlein by a setting of the same tune. In Leipzig, the first Sunday in Advent was the last chance to hear cantata music before Christmas, because tempus clausum was observed during Advent.

== Music ==
=== Structure and scoring ===
Bach structured the cantata in six movements, beginning with chorale fantasia, followed by a series of alternating recitatives and arias and concluded by a chorale. He scored it for three vocal soloists (soprano (S), tenor (T) and bass (B)), and a Baroque instrumental ensemble of violins (Vl), two violas (Va), and basso continuo (Bc), including cello (Vc) and bassoon (Fg). The autograph score is titled: "Dominica 1. Adventus Xsti. / Nun komm der Heyden Heyland. / â . / due Violini / due Viole / Violoncello / è & / Fagotto. / Sopr: Alto. Tenore è Baßo / Col' / Organo. / da / Joh Sebast Bach / anno. / 1714". The duration is given as 18 minutes. According to the Bach scholar Christoph Wolff, the use of two viola parts is French style. Dürr notes that perhaps the strings were doubled by oboes, at least in the Leipzig performance, in a practice that was "not always marked in the score".

In the following table of the movements, the scoring, keys and time signatures are taken from Dürr, using the symbol for common time (4/4). The continuo, playing throughout, is not shown.

Movements of Nun komm, der Heiden Heiland
No.	Title	Text	Type	Vocal	Instruments	Key	Time
1	Nun komm, der Heiden Heiland	Luther	Chorale fantasia	SATB	2Vl 2Va Vc Fg	A minor	3/4
2	Der Heiland ist gekommen	Neumeister	Recitative	T		C major	common time
3	Komm, Jesu, komm zu deiner Kirche	Neumeister	Aria	T	2Vl 2Va (unis.)	C major	9/8
4	Siehe, ich stehe vor der Tür	Neumeister	Recitative	B	2Vl 2Va		common time
5	Öffne dich, mein ganzes Herze	Neumeister	Aria	S	Vc	G major	3/4
6	Amen, Amen, komm du schöne Freudenkrone	Nicolai	Chorale	SATB	2Vl 2Va Fg	G major	common time

=== Movements ===
==== 1 ====
The first Sunday of Advent begins the liturgical year. Bach marked it by creating the opening chorus, "Nun komm, der Heiden Heiland" (Now come, Saviour of the Gentiles), as a chorale fantasia in the style of a French overture, which follows the sequence slow – fast (fugue) – slow. In a French opera performance, the King of France would have entered during the overture; Bach greets a different king. Two of the four lines of the chorale melody are combined in the first slow section, line three is treated in the fast section, and line four in the final slow section. The melody of line 1 is first presented in the continuo, then sung by all four voices one after another, accompanied by a solemn dotted rhythm in the orchestra. Line 2 is sung by all voices together, accompanied by the orchestra. Line 3 is a fast fugato, with the instruments playing colla parte, marked "gai". Line 4 is set as line 2. Wolff notes that Bach possibly followed the model of an opera by Agostino Steffani, Henrico Leone, which uses a chorus in a French overture.

==== 2 ====
The recitative for tenor, "Der Heiland ist gekommen" (The Saviour has come), begins secco but continues as an arioso, with tenor and continuo imitating one another. This more lyrical style of recitative derives from early Italian operas and cantatas, where it was known as mezz'aria – half aria.

==== 3 ====
The tenor aria, "Komm, Jesu, komm zu deiner Kirche" (Come, Jesus, come to Your Church), is accompanied by the violins and violas in unison. It is written in the rhythm of a gigue, and the combination of voice, unison strings and continuo gives it the texture of a trio sonata. Dürr comments that the use of the unison string ritornello, played even during the vocal passages, provides a "rather pointedly strict and unified character". The musicologist Richard Taruskin commented: "This hybridization of operatic and instrumental styles is ... standard operating procedure in Bach's cantatas."

==== 4 ====
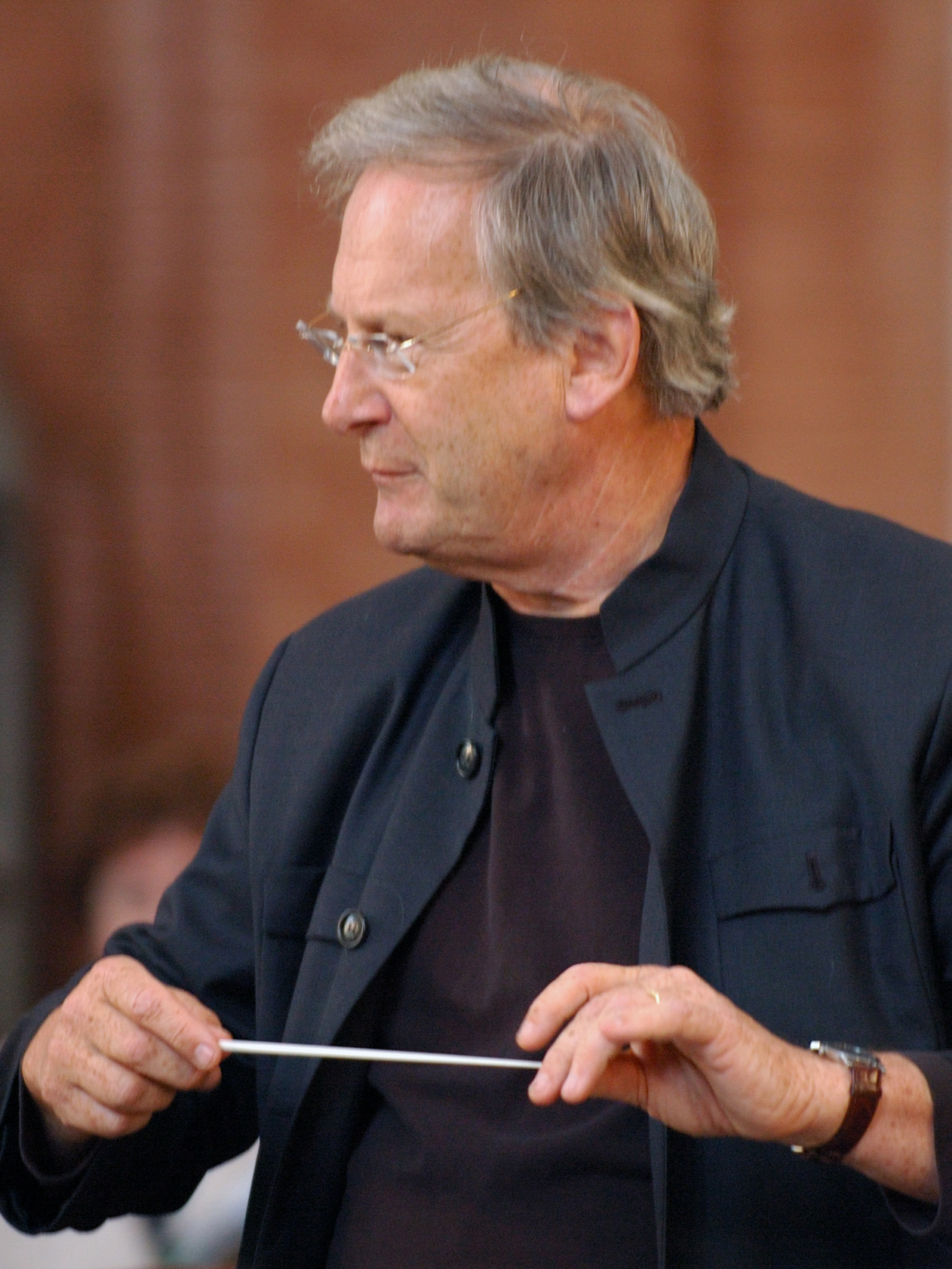
John Eliot Gardiner, 2007

The quote from Revelation, "Siehe, ich stehe vor der Tür und klopfe an" (See, I stand before the door and knock), is given as a recitative to the bass as the vox Christi (voice of Christ). The knocking on the door is expressed by pizzicato chords in the strings. Dürr notes: "The most expressive text-engendered declamation is here ingeniously melted down into a structure only ten bars long but of compelling musical logic." John Eliot Gardiner, who conducted the Bach Cantata Pilgrimage in 2000, compares it to an Emmaus scene in Bach's later cantata Bleib bei uns, denn es will Abend werden, BWV 6, the "post-Resurrection appearance to the disciples" in Halt im Gedächtnis Jesum Christ, BWV 67, even to "the entry of the Commendatore in Mozart’s opera Don Giovanni. Bach would later frequently use the bass as the voice of Christ, in his St Matthew Passion even with a similar string accompaniment.

==== 5 ====
The response to the invitation is the individual prayer of the soprano, "Öffne dich, mein ganzes Herze" (Open, my whole heart). It is accompanied only by the continuo, with an adagio middle section.

==== 6 ====
In the closing chorale, "Amen, amen! Komm, du schöne Freudenkrone" (Amen, amen! Come, you fair crown of joy), Bach sets the Abgesang only of the final stanza of Nicolai's hymn. The musicologist Julian Mincham offers the thought: "Conceivably the most convincing explanation lies, as it so often does, within the text– ... do not delay, I await You longingly. The hymn tune itself, through its very abbreviation implies a sense of urgency and the feeling of being unable to defer any longer." In Bach's setting, the violin adds a jubilant fifth part to the four vocal parts. The violin has to "climb three octaves to convey the extent of the soul's longing for the joys of a future life and the prospect of Jesus returning at the end of time".

== Recordings ==
The listing is taken from the selection on the Bach Cantatas Website. Vocal groups with one voice per part (OVPP) and instrumental groups playing period instruments in historically informed performances are marked by green background.

Recordings of Nun komm, der Heiden Heiland
Title	Conductor / Choir / Orchestra	Soloists	Label	Year	Choir type	Instr.
J. S. Bach Collector's Series	Helmut Kahlhöfer Kantorei Barmen-Gemarke Deutsche Bachsolisten	Ingeborg Reichelt; Theo Altmeyer; Eduard Wollitz	Bach Recordings	1966		
Bach Cantatas Vol. 1 – Advent and Christmas	Karl Richter Münchener Bach-Chor Münchener Bach-Orchester	Edith Mathis; Peter Schreier; Dietrich Fischer-Dieskau	Archiv Produktion	1971		
Die Bach Kantate Vol. 16	Helmuth Rilling Gächinger Kantorei Bach-Collegium Stuttgart	Helen Donath; Adalbert Kraus; Wolfgang Schöne	Hänssler	1974		
Bach Made in Germany Vol. 4 – Cantatas VIII	Hans-Joachim Rotzsch Thomanerchor Neues Bachisches Collegium Musicum	Arleen Augér; Peter Schreier; Siegfried Lorenz	Eterna	1981		
J. S. Bach: Complete Cantatas Vol. 2	Ton Koopman Amsterdam Baroque Orchestra & Choir	Barbara Schlick; Christoph Prégardien; Klaus Mertens	Antoine Marchand	1995		Period
J. S. Bach: Cantatas Vol. 7 – BWV 61, 63, 132, 172	Masaaki Suzuki Bach Collegium Japan	Ingrid Schmithüsen; Makoto Sakurada; Peter Kooy	BIS	1997		Period
Bach Edition Vol. 4 – Cantatas Vol. 1	Pieter Jan Leusink Holland Boys Choir Netherlands Bach Collegium	Ruth Holton; Knut Schoch; Bas Ramselaar	Brilliant Classics	1999		Period
Bach Cantatas Vol. 13: Köln/Lüneburg / For the 1st Sunday in Advent / For the 4th Sunday in Advent	John Eliot Gardiner Monteverdi Choir English Baroque Soloists	Joanne Lunn; Jan Kobow; Dietrich Henschel	Soli Deo Gloria	2000		Period
J. S. Bach: Cantatas	Nikolaus Harnoncourt Arnold Schoenberg Chor Concentus Musicus Wien	Bernarda Fink; Werner Güra; Christian Gerhaher	Deutsche Harmonia Mundi	2006		Period
Bach: Cantates pour la Nativité, Intégrale des cantates sacrées Vol. 4	Eric Milnes Montréal Baroque	Monika Mauch; Matthew White; Charles Daniels; Harry van der Kamp	ATMA Classique	2007	OVPP	Period
J. S. Bach: Cantatas for the Complete Liturgical Year Vol. 9	Sigiswald Kuijken La Petite Bande	Gerlinde Sämann; Petra Noskaiová; Christoph Genz; Jan van der Crabben	Accent	2008	OVPP	Period

== Sources ==
- Nun komm, der Heiden Heiland, BWV 61: Scores at the International Music Score Library Project
- Nun komm, der Heiden Heiland BWV 61; BC A 1 / Sacred cantata (1st Sunday of Advent) Bach Digital
- BWV 61 Nun komm, der Heiden Heiland: English translation, University of Vermont
