= Nun komm, der Heiden Heiland, BWV 62 =

1724 composition by J. S. Bach

Nun komm, der Heiden Heiland
- BWV 62
- Chorale cantata by J. S. Bach
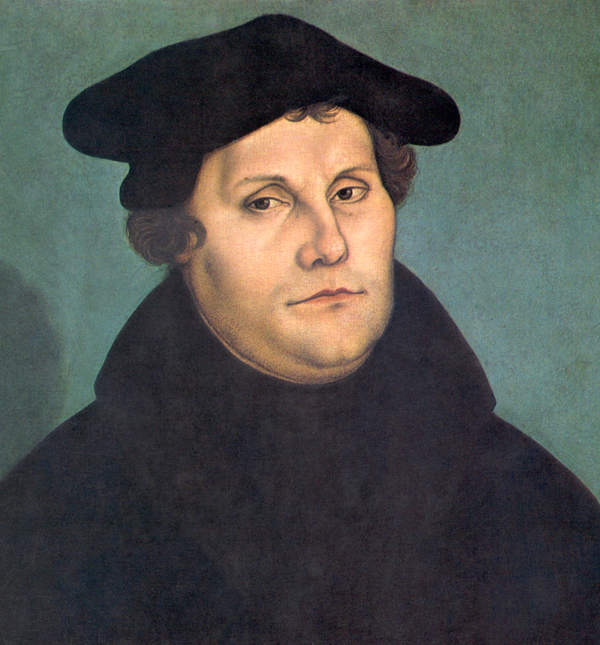
- Martin Luther, author of the hymn, in 1533 by Lucas Cranach the Elder
- Occasion: First Sunday in Advent
- Chorale: "Nun komm, der Heiden Heiland" by Martin Luther
- Performed: 3 December 1724: Leipzig
- Movements: 6
- Vocal: SATB choir and solo
- Instrumental: horn; 2 oboes; 2 violins; 2 violas; continuo

Johann Sebastian Bach composed the church cantata Nun komm, der Heiden Heiland (Now come, Savior of the heathens), BWV 62, in Leipzig for the first Sunday in Advent and first performed it on 3 December 1724. It is based on Martin Luther's Advent hymn "Nun komm, der Heiden Heiland", a paraphrase of the Latin hymn "Veni redemptor gentium". The cantata is part of Bach's chorale cantata cycle, the second cycle during his tenure as Thomaskantor that began in 1723. In the format of this cycle, the text of the first and last stanzas of the hymn is retained unchanged while the text of the inner stanzas was paraphrased by an unknown librettist into a sequence of alternating arias and recitatives. The cantata is opened by a chorale fantasia and closed by a four-part chorale setting.

The cantata is scored for four vocal soloists, a four-part choir, and a Baroque instrumental ensemble of horn only to support the chorale melody, two oboes, strings and basso continuo.

== History, hymn and words ==
Bach composed a cantata with the same name, Nun komm, der Heiden Heiland, BWV 61, for the First Sunday of Advent in 1714 when he worked for the court of Weimar. The libretto by Erdmann Neumeister included for the first movement the first stanza of Martin Luther's Advent hymn of the same name, the number one hymn to begin the Liturgical year with Advent in all Lutheran hymnals at the time.

In 1723, Bach was appointed Thomaskantor (director of church music) in Leipzig, where he was responsible for the music at four churches, and for the training and education of boys singing in the Thomanerchor. He took office in the middle of the liturgical year, on the first Sunday after Trinity, 30 May 1723. Bach wrote Nun komm, der Heiden Heiland, BWV 62, in 1724, his second year as Thomaskantor, for the First Sunday of Advent, as part of his chorale cantata cycle.

The prescribed readings for the Sunday were from the Epistle to the Romans, night is advanced, day will come (Romans 13:11–14), and from the Gospel of Matthew, the Entry into Jerusalem (Matthew 21:1–9). The cantata is based on Martin Luther's hymn "Nun komm, der Heiden Heiland". For the hymn, Luther had paraphrased the Latin hymn for Advent "Veni redemptor gentium".

In the format of the chorale cantata cycle, an unknown poet who collaborated with Bach retained the first and last stanza, and paraphrased the inner stanzas (2 to 7). He shaped the content of stanzas 2 and 3 to an aria, stanzas 4 and 5 to a recitative, and the remaining stanzas to an aria and a duet recitative. While Luther, influenced by the Latin model, phrased succinctly and sometimes in allusions, Bach's collaborator in Leipzig texted often freely and with poetic ambition.

Bach led the Thomanerchor in the first performance of the cantata on 3 December 1724. Another performance is documented between 1732 and 1735. It was performed again in 1736, with an added part for violone in all movements, after the Thomasschule had bought an instrument at an auction in 1735. Bach's score contains a detailed list of the liturgy of the service on the Advent Sunday. Hans-Joachim Schulze argues that Bach may have written it as instruction for a substitute while he was absent from Leipzig that day; he had to travel to Dresden to receive the title Hofcompositeur (Court composer) from the Elector of Saxony, Frederick Augustus II, on Saturday 1 December 1736, giving an organ concert at the Hofkirche's new Silbermann organ. Bach's successor Johann Friedrich Doles performed the cantata after Bach's death.

== Music ==
=== Structure and scoring ===
Bach structured the cantata in six movements, beginning with a chorale fantasia, followed by a series of alternating arias and recitatives, and concluded by a chorale. He scored it for four vocal soloists (soprano (S), alto (A), tenor (T) and bass (B)), and a Baroque instrumental ensemble of horn (Co), only to support the chorale melody, two oboes (Ob), two violin parts (Vl), a viola part (Va), and basso continuo (Bc). The duration is given as 22 minutes.

In the following table of the movements, the scoring, keys and time signatures are taken from Alfred Dürr's standard work Die Kantaten von Johann Sebastian Bach, using the symbol for common time (4/4). The continuo, playing throughout, is not shown.

Movements of Nun komm, der Heiden Heiland
No.	Title	Text	Type	Vocal	Winds	Strings	Key	Time
1	Nun komm, der Heiden Heiland	Luther	Chorale fantasia	SATB	Co 2Ob	2Vl Va	B minor	8/4
2	Bewundert, o Menschen, dies große Geheimnis	anon.	Aria	T	2Ob	2Vl Va	G major	3/8
3	So geht aus Gottes Herrlichkeit und Thron	anon.	Recitative	B				common time
4	Streite, siege, starker Held!	anon.	Aria	B		2Vl 2Va	D major	common time
5	Wir ehren diese Herrlichkeit	anon.	Recitative duet	S A		2Vl Va		common time
6	Lob sei Gott dem Vater ton	Luther	Chorale	SATB	Co 2Ob	2Vl Va	B minor	common time

=== Movements ===
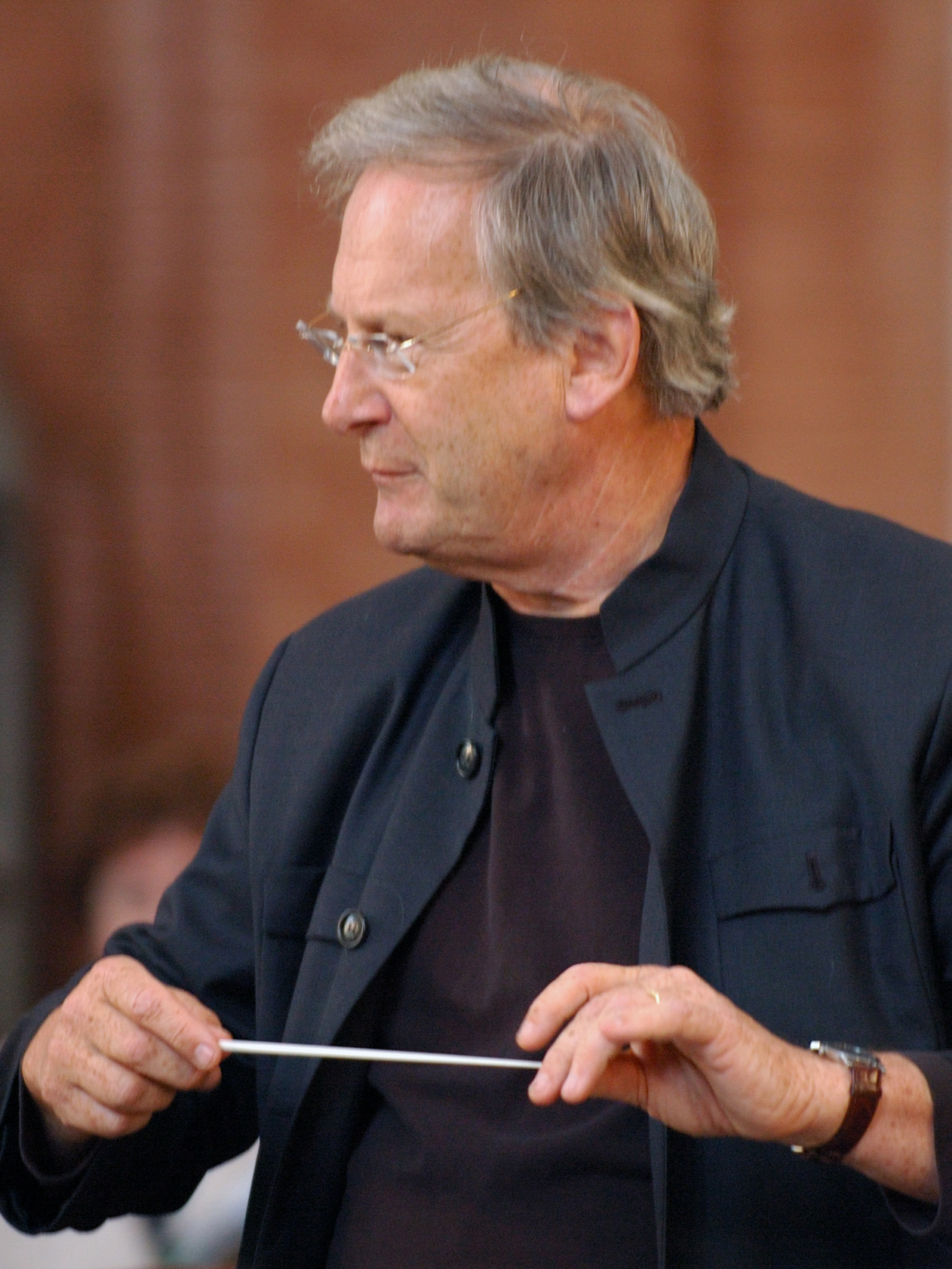
Gardiner in a rehearsal, 2007

The hymn tune is based on the medieval chant of the paraphrased hymn; John Eliot Gardiner, who conducted the Bach Cantata Pilgrimage in 2000, described it as of "dark, imposing character". The melody is in four lines, the last one equal to the first.

Church music was allowed in Leipzig only on the first Sunday of Advent. Gardiner observed about the three extant cantatas for this occasion, also Nun komm, der Heiden Heiland, BWV 61, and Schwingt freudig euch empor, BWV 36, which all deal with Luther's hymn, that they "display a sense of excitement at the onset of the Advent season. This can be traced back both to qualities inherent in the chorale tune itself, and to the central place Bach gives to Luther's words."

==== 1 ====
Typical for the cantatas of the chorale cantata cycle, the first movement is a chorale fantasia with the text of Luther's first stanza:

Nun komm der Heiden Heiland,
Der Jungfrauen Kind erkannt,
Des sich wundert alle Welt,
Gott solch Geburt ihm bestellt.

Translation:

Now come, the savior of the Gentiles,
Known as the Virgin’s child,
Of this, all the world marvels:
God ordained him such a birth.

The music opens with an instrumental ritornello, beginning with a quote of the first (and last) line of the tune in the continuo, and ending with a slightly different quote in the oboes. Other than these quotes, the orchestra plays a free concerto, with the oboes introducing a theme and the first violin playing figuration. The ritornello appears shortened three times to separate the lines of the text and in full at the end. The soprano sings the cantus firmus in long notes, while the lower voices prepare each entry in imitation, using a motif from the tune for the first line, an inverted motif from the tune for the second line, motifs from the ritornello in the third line and an expanded reprise of the first line for the last. Dürr suggested that Bach was inspired to this festive setting in 6/4 time by the Gospel reading about the entry into Jerusalem. Christoph Wolff pointed out that the instrumentation is simple because Advent was a "season of abstinence". Schulze wrote that the "unity of the instrumental component serves the cohesion of the entire movement" and noted that the "anticipatory imitation" of the lower voices is more extended than in other chorale cantatas because elaborate coloratura is used to illustrate the phrase "des sich wundert alle Welt": the marveling of all the world.

==== 2 ====
The first aria, for tenor, deals with the mystery of the birth of Jesus: "Bewundert, o Menschen, dies große Geheimnis: der höchste Beherrscher erscheinet der Welt" (Marvel, O humanity, at this great mystery: the Supreme Ruler appears to the world ). Set in a major key in Siciliano rhythm, with string accompaniment doubled in tutti sections by the oboes, the music was described by Dürr as "joyfully soaring". Schulze noted the dance character of the aria, between passepied and minuet which begins with 24 measures of instrumental music. He described the dominating motif in the voice as song-like and rhythmically succinct.

==== 3 ====
A secco recitative for bass expresses: "So geht aus Gottes Herrlichkeit und Thron sein eingeborner Sohn" (Thus from God's glory and throne goes forth his only-begotten Son).

==== 4 ====
In great contrast to the first aria, the second one, for bass, is focused on fight: "Streite, siege, starker Held!" (Struggle, conquer, powerful hero!) The aspect was introduced by the librettist, who transformed Luther's address of Jesus as "equal to the Father" into calling a strong hero.

Schulze regarded elements of "rolling passages" in the voice and fanfare-like instrumental unison passages as typical for the era's "arias with heroic gesture". Dürr described the motifs in the continuo as militant and tumultuous. In a later version the voice is doubled by the upper strings. Gardiner regarded the aria's "pompous, combative character" as a sketch for the bass aria "Großer Herr und starker König" from Part I of Bach's 1734 Christmas Oratorio.

==== 5 ====
The duet recitative of the high voices, "Wir ehren diese Herrlichkeit und nahen nun zu deiner Krippen" (We honor this glory and approach your manger now), expresses thanks, intimately accompanied by the strings. According to Schulze, modulation into distant keys illustrates the miracle of the birth and the way to the manger, who described the music as otherworldly and luminous.

==== 6 ====
The closing chorale of the cantata is a doxology, "Lob sei Gott, dem Vater, g'ton" (Praise be to God the Father), which treats the medieval melody to a four-part setting.

== Manuscripts and publication ==
Bach's autograph score of the cantata and the set of parts are extant. It was first published in 1868 in the first complete edition of Bach's work, the Bach-Gesellschaft Ausgabe. The volume in question was edited by Wilhelm Rust. In the Neue Bach-Ausgabe it was published in 1954, edited by Dürr and Werner Neumann, with a critical report in 1955.

== Recordings ==
A list of recordings is provided on the Bach Cantatas Website. Vocal ensembles with one voice per part (OVPP) and instrumental groups playing period instruments in historically informed performances are marked by green background.

Recordings of Nun komm, der Heiden Heiland
Title	Conductor / Choir / Orchestra	Soloists	Label	Year	Choir type	Instr.
Cantatas	Erhard Mauersberger Thomanerchor Gewandhausorchester	Adele Stolte; Gerda Schriever; Peter Schreier; Theo Adam	Eterna	1967		
J. S. Bach: Das Kantatenwerk – Sacred Cantatas Vol. 4	Nikolaus Harnoncourt Tölzer Knabenchor Concentus Musicus Wien	soloist of the Tölzer Knabenchor; Paul Esswood; Kurt Equiluz; Ruud van der Meer	Teldec	1977		Period
Die Bach Kantate Vol. 69	Helmuth Rilling Gächinger Kantorei Bach-Collegium Stuttgart	Inga Nielsen; Helen Donath; Aldo Baldin; Philippe Huttenlocher	Hänssler	1980		
J. S. Bach: Advent Cantatas	Philippe Herreweghe Collegium Vocale Gent	Sibylla Rubens; Sarah Connolly; Christoph Prégardien; Peter Kooy	Harmonia Mundi France	1996		Period
Bach Edition Vol. 12 – Cantatas Vol. 6	Pieter Jan Leusink Holland Boys Choir Netherlands Bach Collegium	Ruth Holton; Sytse Buwalda; Nico van der Meel; Bas Ramselaar	Brilliant Classics	1999		Period
Bach Cantatas Vol. 13: Köln/Lüneburg / For the 1st Sunday in Advent / For the 4th Sunday in Advent	John Eliot Gardiner Monteverdi Choir English Baroque Soloists	Joanne Lunn; William Towers; Jan Kobow; Dietrich Henschel	Soli Deo Gloria	2000		Period
J. S. Bach: Complete Cantatas Vol. 13	Ton Koopman Amsterdam Baroque Orchestra & Choir	Deborah York; Franziska Gottwald; Paul Agnew; Klaus Mertens	Antoine Marchand	2000		Period
J. S. Bach: Cantatas Vol. 28 – Cantatas from Leipzig 1724	Masaaki Suzuki Bach Collegium Japan	Yukari Nonoshita; Robin Blaze; Makoto Sakurada; Peter Kooy	BIS	2004		Period
J. S. Bach: Cantatas for the Complete Liturgical Year Vol. 9	Sigiswald Kuijken La Petite Bande	Gerlinde Sämann; Petra Noskaiová; Christoph Genz; Jan van der Crabben	Accent	2008	OVPP	Period
