= Nun komm, der Heiden Heiland (Böhm) =

Cantata

- Advent cantata by Georg Böhm
- Occasion: First Sunday of Advent
- Text: "Nun komm, der Heiden Heiland" by Martin Luther
- Movements: 11
- Vocal: SATB solo and choir
- Instrumental: 3 trombones; 2 violins; continuo

Nun komm, der Heiden Heiland (Savior of the Nations, Come), is a cantata for soloists, a choir and instruments by Georg Böhm for the first Sunday of Advent, the Sunday that begins the liturgical year.

Böhm was an organist at St. Johannis, Lüneburg, from 1698. At the time, Luther's hymn "Nun komm, der Heiden Heiland", with a melody by Johann Walter based on Medieval chant, was the main hymn assigned to the first Sunday of Advent. In his cantata, Böhm set all eight stanzas of the hymn. He structured the cantata in eleven movements, beginning with an instrumental sonata followed by different settings of the first four stanzas, a repeat of the sonata, four more different settings of the other four stanzas and a concluding fugue, Amen. He set the work for five vocal soloists (SSATB), a choir, three trombones, two violins and continuo. It is one of twelve extant cantatas attributed to Böhm and was published in 1963 as part of his complete works. A new edition was prepared by William Braun for four voices, two violins and continuo.

The cantata was recorded in 2008, together with four other cantatas by Böhm, by the ensembles Capella Sancti Georgi and Musica Alta Ripa, conducted by Ralf Popken, with soloists Irmela Brünger, Inga Schneider, Beat Duddeck, Jörn Lindemann and Markus Flaig. A reviewer noted the settings as magnificent and original designs ("prächtig und originell gestaltet"), not only in first-class compositional skill, but also in a tireless musical will to preach ("nicht nur erstklassigem kompositorischen Können, sondern auch unermüdlichem musikalischen Verkündigungswillen"). Another reviewer noted that Böhm's cantatas are stylistically between the sacred concerto of the 17th century and the cantatas of the early 18th century, further commenting: "These compositions are also musically captivating, showing a strong connection between text and music and the use of various compositional techniques."

== Structure ==
Böhm structured the cantata in eleven movements:

1. Sonate
2. Versus 1: Nun komm, der Heiden Heiland
3. Versus 2: Nicht von Mannsblut
4. Versus 3: Der Jungfrauen Leib
5. Versus 4: Er ging aus der Kammer sein
6. Sonate
7. Versus 5: Sein Lauf kam vom Vater her
8. Versus 6: Der du bist dem Vater gleich
9. Versus 7: Dein Krippen glänzt hell und klar
10. Versus 8: Lob sei Gott dem Vater ton
11. Conclusio: Amen
