= Es woll uns Gott genädig sein =

Lutheran hymn

- Hymn by Martin Luther
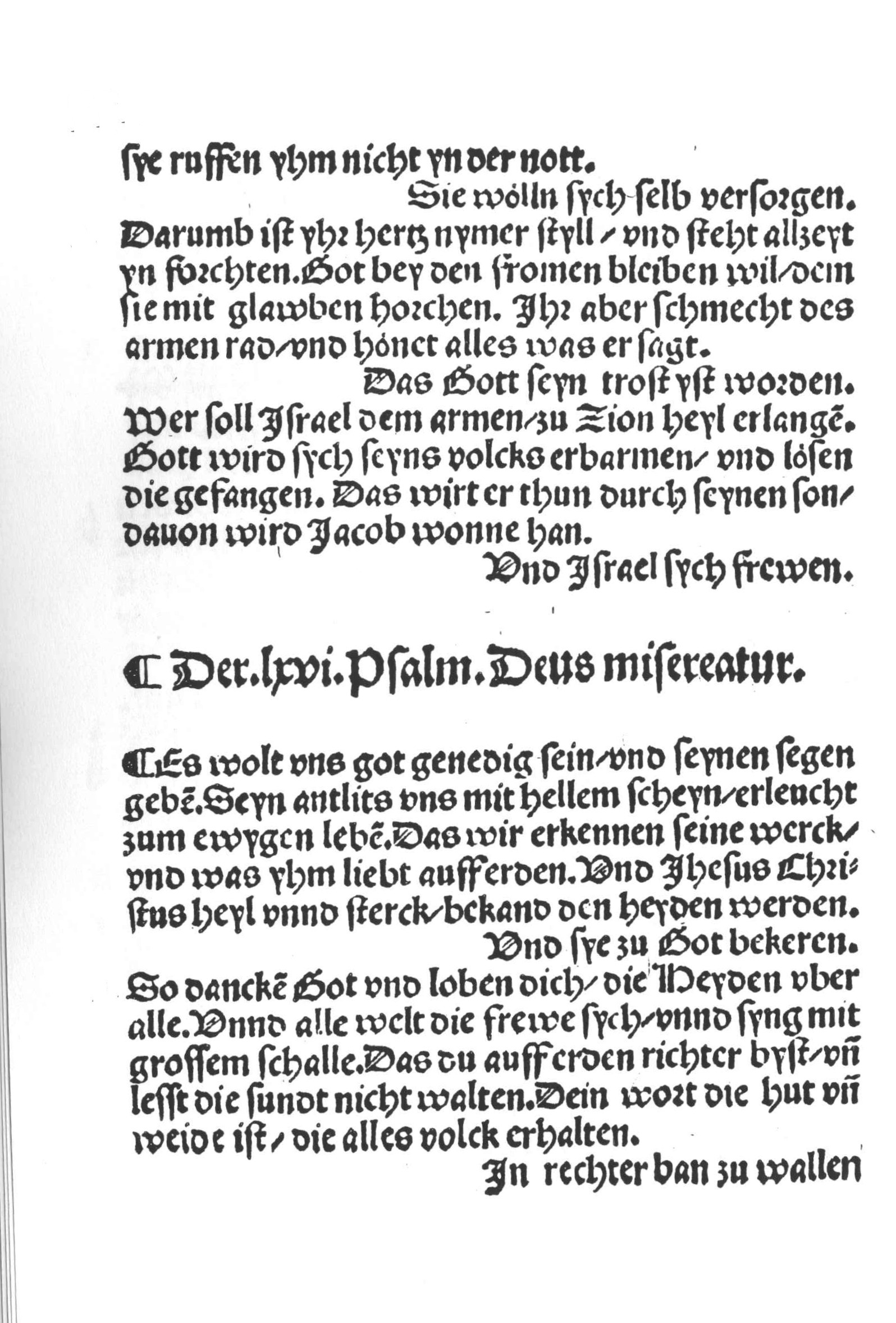
- "Es wolt uns got genedig sein" in the Erfurt Enchiridion, 1524
- English: May God be gracious to us
- Catalogue: Zahn (7246)–7247
- Text: by Martin Luther
- Language: German
- Based on: Psalm 67
- Melody: by Matthias Greitter
- Published: 1524

"Es woll uns Gott genädig sein" ("May God be gracious to us", or more literally: "May God want to be merciful to us") is a Lutheran hymn, with words written by Martin Luther based on the Psalm 67. The hymn in three stanzas of nine lines each was first published in Wittenberg in 1524. Its best known hymn tune, Zahn No. 7247, was published in Strasbourg in 1524. Heinrich Schütz and Johann Sebastian Bach wrote settings of the hymn. It was translated to English and has appeared in dozens of hymnals.

== History ==
Luther wrote in a letter to Georg Spalatin, around the end of 1523, about the importance of writing "Deutsche Psalmen" (German psalms). Trying to win Spalatin for collaboration, he specifies:

Neue und modische Wörter sähe ich gern vermieden; denn um die Gemeinde zu gewinnen, muss man ganz schlichte und volkstümliche, doch zugleich saubere und geeignete Wörter wählen, und der Sinn soll klar und möglichst psalmnah wiedergegeben sein. Deshalb muss man frei verfahren und den angenommenen Sinn ohne Rücksicht auf den Wortlaut durch geeignete Worte übertragen.

(I would like to see new and fashionable words avoided; for in order to win the congregation, one has to choose quite simple and popular words, but at the same time clean and suitable ones, and the meaning should be rendered clearly and as closely to the psalm as possible. Therefore one has to proceed freely and transfer the assumed meaning without regard to exact text by suitable words.)

Luther wrote "Es wolt uns got genedig sein" as a paraphrase of Psalms 67 in three stanzas of nine lines each. It was first printed in Wittenberg in 1524, first in a leaflet together with "Aus tiefer Not schrei ich zu dir”, a paraphrase of Psalm 130. It appeared then in Luther's Ein weyse Christliche Messe zu halten und zum Tisch Gottis zu gehen (A way to hold a Christian mass and to go to the table of God). It was published the same year in the Erfurt Enchiridion.

== Lyrics ==
German (Note: Enchiridion oder eyn Handbuchlein, eynem yetzlichen Christen fast nutzlich bey sich zuhaben, zur stetter ubung unnd trachtung geystlicher gesenge, und Psalmen, Rechtschaffen unnd kunstlich vertheutscht. 1524, "Der .lxvi. Psalm. Deus misereatur".)

Es wolt uns Got genedig sein,
und seinen segen geben.
Sein antlytz uns mit hellem schein
erleucht zum ewigen leben.
Das wir erkennen seine werck,
unnd was yhm lyebt auff erden.
Und Jhesus Christus heyl und sterk,
bekant den heyden werden.
Unnd sie zu Got bekeren.

So dancken got und loben dich,
die Heyden uber alle.
Und alle welt die frewe sich,
und sing mit grossem schalle.
Das du auff erden richter byst,
unnd lest die sundt nicht waltenn.
Deyn wordt die huet unnd weyde ist,
die alles volck erhalten.
In rechter ban zu wallen.

Es dancke Got und lobe dich,
das volck in gutten thatten.
Das landt bryngt frucht und bessert sich,
dein wordt ist wol geratten.
Uns segen vater und der son,
uns segen got der heylig geyst.
Dem alle welt die ehre thun,
fur ym sich furcht allermeyst.
Nu sprecht von hertzen Amen.

Psalm (KJV)

God be merciful unto us, and bless us;
and cause his face to shine upon us.
That thy way may be known upon earth,
thy saving health among all nations.

Let the people praise thee, O God;
let all the people praise thee.
O let the nations be glad and sing for joy:
for thou shalt judge the people righteously,
and govern the nations upon earth.

Let the people praise thee, O God;
let all the people praise thee.
Then shall the earth yield her increase;
and God, even our own God, shall bless us.
God shall bless us;
and all the ends of the earth shall fear him.

== Melody and settings ==
Johann Walter's "Es woll uns Gott genädig sein" hymn tune, Zahn No. 7246, originally composed for another hymn, was published in 1524. That hymn tune, however, was from 1543 associated with the "Christ unser Herr zum Jordan kam" hymn. Another tune for the "Es woll uns Gott genädig sein" hymn, Zahn No. 7247, was published in 1524 in Strasbourg.

Heinrich Schütz set it as part of his Becker Psalter of all psalms in German. Johann Sebastian Bach used it as the basis for chorale preludes, and in cantatas such as his second cantata as Thomaskantor in Leipzig, Die Himmel erzählen die Ehre Gottes, BWV 76, when he closed part I with the first stanza and part II with the last.

== Translation ==
The hymn was translated to English and has appeared in over 25 hymnals. A. T. Russell translated it as "May God unto us gracious be" and included it in his Psalms & Hymns, printed in 1851. Richard Massie translated it in 1851 to "May God bestow on us His grace".
