= Psalm 67 =

Biblical psalm

- "God be merciful unto us, and bless us"
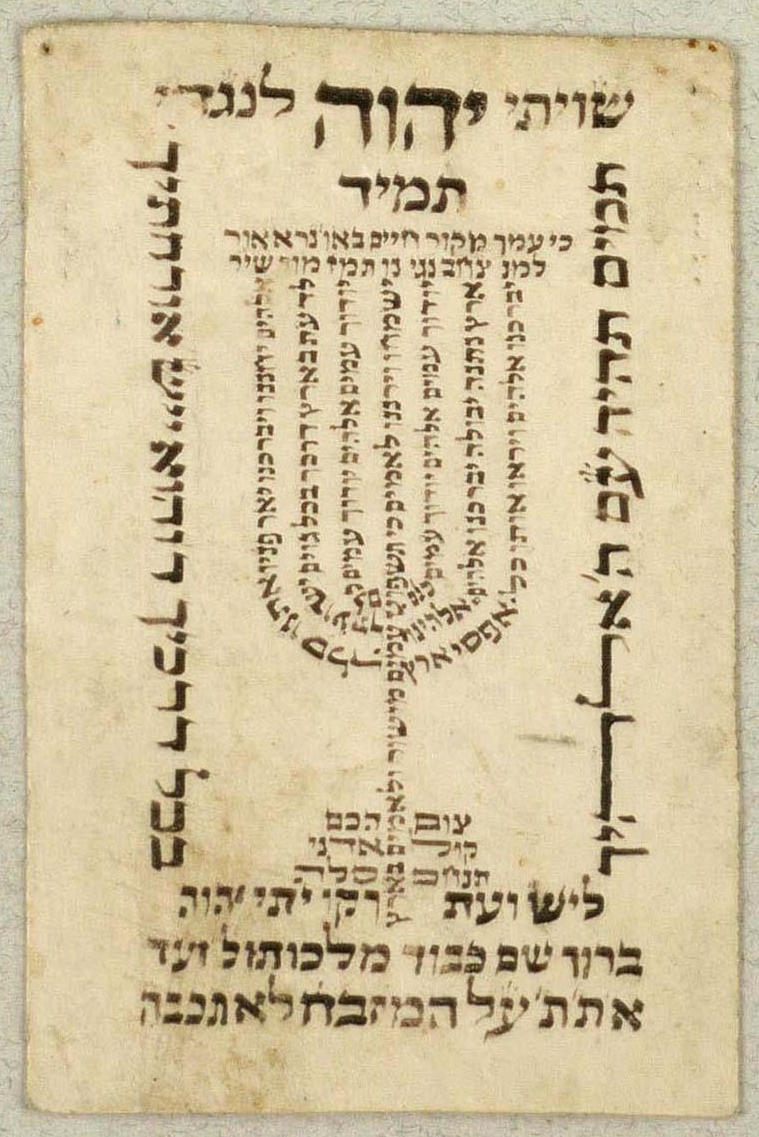
- Psalm 67 written in the shape of the menorah, a form called Shiviti
- Other name: Psalm 66; "Deus misereatur"
- Language: Hebrew (original)

Psalm 67
- ← Psalm 66 Psalm 68 →
- Book: Book of Psalms
- Hebrew Bible part: Ketuvim
- Order in the Hebrew part: 1
- Category: Sifrei Emet
- Christian Bible part: Old Testament
- Order in the Christian part: 19

Psalm 67 is the 67th psalm of the Book of Psalms, beginning in English in the King James Version: "God be merciful unto us, and bless us; and cause his face to shine upon us". In Latin, it is known as "Deus misereatur". In the slightly different numbering system of the Greek Septuagint version of the Bible, and in the Latin Vulgate, this psalm is Psalm 66. Its theme is a prayer for God's mercy, blessing and light.

The psalm forms a regular part of Jewish, Catholic, Lutheran, Anglican and other Protestant liturgies. It has been paraphrased in hymns and set to music.

Biblical commentator Cyril Rodd divides it into three sections: two "broadly parallel" sections in verses 1-3 and 4–5, which seek God's favour and blessing, and verses 6–7, which express universal joy as "all the nations" experience God's blessing. Verses 3 and 5 are a repeated refrain:

May the nations praise you, O God.

Yes, may all the nations praise you.

== Uses ==
=== Judaism ===
In some congregations, Psalm 67 is recited before Maariv on Motzei Shabbat. It is also recited by some before Barukh she'amar and after counting the Omer.

=== Catholic Church ===
Saint Benedict of Nursia selected this psalm as the first psalm of the solemn office at the Sunday lauds. (Rule of St. Benedict, chapter XII). In a certain number of abbeys which maintain tradition, this Sunday service always begins with it. Saint Benedict also asked to perform this psalm during the lauds of the week (chapter XIII). However, other psalms later replaced Psalm 66 (67), with the exception of Sunday, so that all 150 psalms are read weekly.

It is one of the four invitatory prayers of the daily office, and is recited at the vespers of Wednesday of the second week, 8 and at the lauds of the Tuesday of the third week of the four weekly cycle of liturgical prayers.

It is read or sung at several Masses throughout the year because of its theme of the universal grace of God: on the Friday of the third week of Advent, and in the octave of the nativity of Mary. It is also found on the 20th Sunday of the year A (the first of the three years of the cycle of readings intended to ensure that "a more representative portion of sacred Scripture should be read to the people over a prescribed number of years"), the 6th Sunday of Easter in year C and the Wednesday of the 4th week of Easter.

=== Coptic Orthodox Church ===
In the Agpeya, the Coptic Church's book of hours, this psalm is prayed in the offices of Prime and Sext. It is also in the prayer of the Veil, which is generally prayed only by monks.

=== Anglican Church ===
In the Church of England's Book of Common Prayer, this psalm is appointed to be read on the evening of the 12th day of the month, and it may be recited as a canticle in the Anglican liturgy of Evening Prayer according to the Book of Common Prayer as an alternative to the Nunc dimittis, when it is referred to by its incipit as the Deus misereatur, also A Song of God's Blessing.

=== Lutheran churches ===
Martin Luther paraphrased the psalm in the hymn "Es woll uns Gott genädig sein", used particularly in Lutheran churches. In earlier hymnbooks this was set to the old chorale tune "Es wolle Gott uns gnädig sein", but the new Lutheran Service Book also provides a newer tune, "Elvet Banks".

== Musical settings ==
One English hymn paraphrase of this psalm is "God of mercy, God of grace" by Henry Francis Lyte, generally sung to the tune "Heathlands" by Henry Smart. Musical settings of Psalm 67 were composed by Thomas Tallis, Samuel Adler, Charles Ives, Alan Hovhaness, and Ēriks Ešenvalds.

Heinrich Schütz set Psalm 67 in a metred version in German, "Es woll uns Gott genädig sein", SWV 164, as part of the Becker Psalter, first published in 1628.

== Text ==
The following table shows the Hebrew text of the Psalm with vowels, alongside the Koine Greek text in the Septuagint and the English translation from the King James Version. Note that the meaning can slightly differ between these versions, as the Septuagint and the Masoretic Text come from different textual traditions. (Note: A 1917 translation directly from Hebrew to English by the Jewish Publication Society can be found here or here, and an 1844 translation directly from the Septuagint by L. C. L. Brenton can be found here. Both translations are in the public domain.) In the Septuagint, this psalm is numbered Psalm 66.

#	Hebrew	English	Greek
(Note: In the Jewish verse numbering, the ascription of this psalm is verse 1, and the rest of the psalm begins from verse 2. However, the Christian verse numbering does not count the ascription.)	לַמְנַצֵּ֥חַ בִּנְגִינֹ֗ת מִזְמ֥וֹר שִֽׁיר׃	(To the chief Musician on Neginoth, A Psalm or Song.)	Εἰς τὸ τέλος, ἐν ὕμνοις· ψαλμὸς ᾠδῆς τῷ Δαυΐδ. -
1	אֱֽלֹהִ֗ים יְחׇנֵּ֥נוּ וִיבָרְכֵ֑נוּ יָ֤אֵֽר פָּנָ֖יו אִתָּ֣נוּ סֶֽלָה׃	God be merciful unto us, and bless us; and cause his face to shine upon us; Selah.	Ο ΘΕΟΣ οἰκτειρήσαι ἡμᾶς καὶ εὐλογήσαι ἡμᾶς, ἐπιφάναι τὸ πρόσωπον αὑτοῦ ἐφ᾿ ἡμᾶς. (διάψαλμα).
2	לָדַ֣עַת בָּאָ֣רֶץ דַּרְכֶּ֑ךָ בְּכׇל־גּ֝וֹיִ֗ם יְשׁוּעָתֶֽךָ׃	That thy way may be known upon earth, thy saving health among all nations.	τοῦ γνῶναι ἐν τῇ γῇ τὴν ὁδόν σου, ἐν πᾶσιν ἔθνεσι τὸ σωτήριόν σου.
3	יוֹד֖וּךָ עַמִּ֥ים ׀ אֱלֹהִ֑ים י֝וֹד֗וּךָ עַמִּ֥ים כֻּלָּֽם׃	Let the people praise thee, O God; let all the people praise thee.	ἐξομολογησάσθωσάν σοι λαοί, ὁ Θεός, ἐξομολογησάσθωσάν σοι λαοὶ πάντες.
4	יִ֥שְׂמְח֥וּ וִירַנְּנ֗וּ לְאֻ֫מִּ֥ים כִּֽי־תִשְׁפֹּ֣ט עַמִּ֣ים מִישֹׁ֑ר וּלְאֻמִּ֓ים ׀ בָּאָ֖רֶץ תַּנְחֵ֣ם סֶֽלָה׃	O let the nations be glad and sing for joy: for thou shalt judge the people righteously, and govern the nations upon earth. Selah.	εὐφρανθήτωσαν καὶ ἀγαλλιάσθωσαν ἔθνη, ὅτι κρινεῖς λαοὺς ἐν εὐθύτητι καὶ ἔθνη ἐν τῇ γῇ ὁδηγήσεις. (διάψαλμα).
5	יוֹד֖וּךָ עַמִּ֥ים ׀ אֱלֹהִ֑ים י֝וֹד֗וּךָ עַמִּ֥ים כֻּלָּֽם׃	Let the people praise thee, O God; let all the people praise thee.	ἐξομολογησάσθωσάν σοι λαοί, ὁ Θεός, ἐξομολογησάσθωσάν σοι λαοὶ πάντες.
6	אֶ֭רֶץ נָתְנָ֣ה יְבוּלָ֑הּ יְ֝בָרְכֵ֗נוּ אֱלֹהִ֥ים אֱלֹהֵֽינוּ׃	Then shall the earth yield her increase; and God, even our own God, shall bless us.	γῆ ἔδωκε τὸν καρπὸν αὐτῆς· εὐλογήσαι ἡμᾶς ὁ Θεός, ὁ Θεὸς ἡμῶν.
7	יְבָרְכֵ֥נוּ אֱלֹהִ֑ים וְיִֽירְא֥וּ א֝וֹת֗וֹ כׇּל־אַפְסֵי־אָֽרֶץ׃	God shall bless us; and all the ends of the earth shall fear him.	εὐλογήσαι ἡμᾶς ὁ Θεός, καὶ φοβηθήτωσαν αὐτὸν πάντα τὰ πέρατα τῆς γῆς.
