= Nun komm, der Heiden Heiland =

Hymn by Martin Luther

- Hymn by Martin Luther
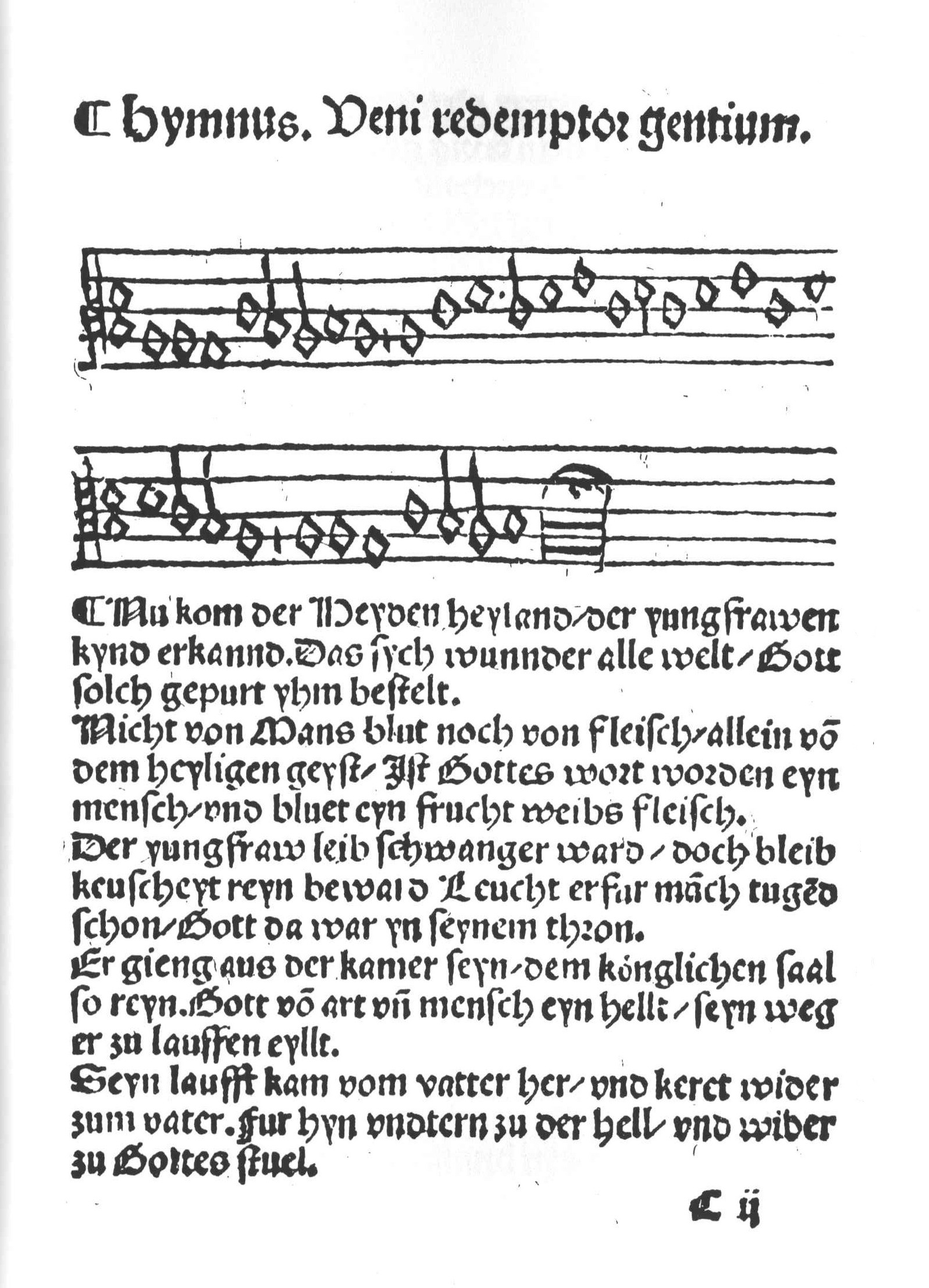
- "Nu kom der Heyden heyland" in the Erfurt Enchiridion
- English: "Savior of the nations, come"
- Catalogue: Zahn 1174
- Occasion: Advent
- Text: by Martin Luther
- Language: German
- Based on: Veni redemptor gentium
- Meter: 7 7 7 7
- Published: 1524

"Nun komm, der Heiden Heiland" (original: "Nu kom der Heyden heyland", English: "Savior of the nations, come", literally: Now come, Saviour of the heathen) is a Lutheran chorale of 1524 with words written by Martin Luther, based on "Veni redemptor gentium" by Ambrose of Milan, and a melody, Zahn 1174, based on its plainchant. It was printed in the Erfurt Enchiridion of 1524.

The song was the prominent hymn for the first Sunday of Advent for centuries. It was used widely in organ settings by Protestant Baroque composers, most notably Johann Sebastian Bach, who also composed two church cantatas beginning with the hymn. Later settings include works by Max Reger, Brian Easdale and Siegfried Strohbach.

English versions include "Savior of the nations, come" by William Morton Reynolds, published in 1851.

== History ==
Martin Luther wrote the text of "Nun komm, der Heiden Heiland" possibly for the Advent of 1523 as a paraphrase of a passage, Veni redemptor gentium, from the Latin Christmas hymn "Intende qui reges Israel" by Ambrose. Several Latin versions begin with "Veni redemptor gentium", in similarity to hymns such as "Veni Creator Spiritus". The themes from the 4th century are the humanity and divinity of Christ, as testified by his birth by the Virgin Mary. Luther wrote the hymn at the end of 1523 in a period when he wrote many hymn texts, mostly psalm paraphrases and some free poems, such as "Nun freut euch, lieben Christen g'mein". He paraphrased the seven stanzas of the Latin hymn rather closely, and added a doxology as an eighth stanza. He seems to have been more interested in keeping the traditional text than fluent German, possibly to demonstrate his closeness to the traditional theology, in contrast to a translation by Thomas Müntzer, who followed his own theology.

The melody, Zahn 1174, was composed by Luther and possibly Johann Walter, based on the original plainchant melodies, such as a 12th-century version from Einsiedeln. The hymn was printed in the Erfurt Enchiridion in 1524, and was also published the same year in Walter's choral Wittenberg hymnal, Eyn geystlich Gesangk Buchleyn. In several hymnals, the hymn opens the collection, such as Klug's Gesangbuch (1529 and 1533), the Babstsches Gesangbuch (1545), and continuing to the Evangelisches Kirchengesangbuch (EKG) of 1950, which retained five of the eight stanzas. In other hymnals, the hymn opened the section related to the liturgical year, such as in Johann Crüger's Praxis Pietatis Melica. In the 1995 Evangelisches Gesangbuch it is EG 4, again in five stanzas.

As well as using the hymn in cantatas, Johann Sebastian Bach arranged the hymn as a chorale prelude more than once. Bach's arrangement has in turn been arranged. One of the most respected solo versions is by Ferruccio Busoni whose writing for the piano evokes the sound of the organ (as in other pieces in the Bach-Busoni Editions). This arrangement has been performed by Vladimir Horowitz and Evgeny Kissin among others.

== Theme and text ==
The song, in eight stanzas of four lines each, expresses first the request for the coming of a redeemer of all people, including the heathens or gentiles, born of a virgin. It reflects his origin from the Father, to whom he will return after going to Hell. The last stanza is a doxology, translating a medieval appendix to Ambrose's hymn. The following shows the Latin original, Luther's translation with numbers given to the five stanzas by Luther contained in the 1995 Evangelisches Gesangbuch, and an English translation by William Morton Reynolds, "Savior of the nations, come", published in 1851.

Ambrose

Veni, redemptor gentium;
Ostende partum virginis;
Miretur omne saeculum.
Talis decet partus Deo.

Non ex virili semine,
Sed mystico spiramine
Verbum Dei factum est caro,
Fructusque ventris floruit.

Alvus tumescit virginis.
Claustrum pudoris permanet;
Vexilla virtutum micant,
Versatur in templo Deus.

Procedit e thalamo suo,
Pudoris aula regia,
Geminae gigans substantiae
Alacris ut currat viam.

Egressus eius a Patre,
Regressus eius ad Patrem;
Excursus usque ad inferos
Recursus ad sedem Dei.

Aequalis aeterno Patri,
Carnis tropaeo accingere,
Infirma nostri corporis
Virtute firmans perpeti.

Praesepe iam fulget tuum,
Lumenque nox spirat novum,
Quod nulla nox interpolet
Fideque iugi luceat.

Gloria tibi, Domine,
Qui natus es de virgine,
Cum Patre et Sancto Spiritu,
In sempiterna saecula.

Luther

1. Nun komm, der Heiden Heiland,
der Jungfrauen Kind erkannt,
dass sich wunder alle Welt,
Gott solch Geburt ihm bestellt.

Nicht von Manns Blut noch von Fleisch,
allein von dem Heiligen Geist
ist Gottes Wort worden Mensch
und blüht ein Frucht Weibes Fleisch.

Der Jungfrauen Leib schwanger ward,
doch blieb Keuschheit rein bewahrt,
leucht hervor manche Tugend schon,
Gott war da in seinem Thron.

2. Er ging aus der Kammer sein,
dem königlichen Saal so rein,
Gott von Art und Mensch ein Held,
sein Weg er zu laufen eilt.

3. Sein Lauf kam vom Vater her
und kehrt wieder zum Vater,
fuhr hinunter zu der Höll
und wieder zu Gottes Stuhl.

Der du bist dem Vater gleich,
führ hinaus den Sieg im Fleisch,
dass dein ewige Gottesgewalt
in uns das kranke Fleisch erhalt.

4. Dein Krippen glänzt hell und klar,
die Nacht gibt ein neu Licht dar.
Dunkel muss nicht kommen drein,
der Glaub bleib immer im Schein.

5. Lob sei Gott dem Vater g'ton;
Lob sei Gott seim eingen Sohn,
Lob sei Gott dem Heilgen Geist
immer und in Ewigkeit.

Reynolds

1. Savior of the nations, come;
Virgin's Son, here make Thy home!
Marvel now, O heaven and earth,
That the Lord chose such a birth.

2. Not by human flesh and blood;
By the Spirit of our God
Was the Word of God made flesh,
Woman's offspring, pure and fresh.

3. Wondrous birth! O wondrous Child
Of the virgin undefiled!
Though by all the world disowned,
Still to be in heaven enthroned.

4. From the Father forth He came
And returneth to the same,
Captive leading death and hell
High the song of triumph swell!

5. Thou, the Father's only Son,
Hast over sin the victory won.
Boundless shall Thy kingdom be;
When shall we its glories see?

6. Brightly doth Thy manger shine,
Glorious is its light divine.
Let not sin overcloud this light;
Ever be our faith thus bright.

7. Praise to God the Father sing,
Praise to God the Son, our King,
Praise to God the Spirit be
Ever and eternally.

== Melody and musical settings ==
Luther derived the melody from the Latin hymn's medieval plainchant melodies, making changes to accommodate the more accented German. His major achievement was to repeat the first melodic line in the last, forming an A–B–C–A structure and transforming the medieval hymn into a Lutheran chorale.

Nun komm der Heiden Heiland (Pachelbel)
Organ setting by Pachelbel, recorded in Trubschachen, Switzerland

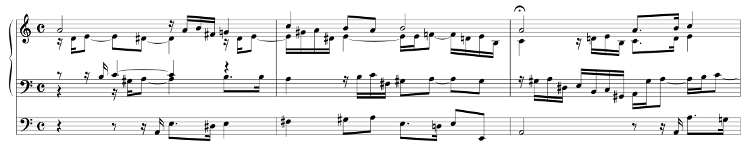
Beginning of Bach's chorale prelude BWV 599

The chorale was used as the prominent hymn for the first Sunday of Advent for centuries. It was used widely in organ settings by Protestant Baroque composers, including Johann Pachelbel and, most notably Johann Sebastian Bach, who set it as the opening chorale prelude (BWV 599) of the Orgelbüchlein and three times—as BWV 659 (one of his best known organ compositions), BWV 660 and BWV 661—in his Great Eighteen Chorale Preludes.

Georg Böhm set all eight stanzas of the hymn in a cantata Nun komm, der Heiden Heiland for soloists, choir and instruments. Bach used the hymn in two church cantatas for the first Sunday of Advent, his chorale cantata Nun komm, der Heiden Heiland, BWV 62 (1724) and in the opening chorale fantasia of his earlier cantata Nun komm, der Heiden Heiland, BWV 61 (1714). Max Reger composed a setting as No. 29 of his 52 Chorale Preludes, Op. 67 in 1902.

"Nun komm, der Heiden Heiland" continues to be used in modern settings. It appears in liturgically oriented Christian hymnals, for example the Lutheran Book of Worship, and as the cantus firmus for organ compositions. In Brian Easdale's score for the 1948 film The Red Shoes, the melody from the chorale is heard as a theme late in the ballet, punctuated by ringing bells, brass instruments and a grand piano. Siegfried Strohbach composed a choral setting in 1988.
