= Eric Milnes =

American harpsichordist, organist and conductor

- Born: May 7, 1959 (age 67); Huntington, New York, U.S.
- Education: Columbia College; Columbia University; Juilliard School of Music
- Occupations: Harpsichordist; Organist; Conductor; Academic teacher
- Organization: Montreal Baroque Orchestra

Eric Milnes (born May 7, 1959) is an American harpsichordist, organist and conductor, especially in the field of Baroque music. He began a series of recordings of all Bach cantatas with singers performing one voice per part and the Montreal Baroque Orchestra.

== Career ==
Born in Huntington, New York, Milnes studied in New York City at Columbia College, Columbia University and the Juilliard School of Music. He made several recordings as instrumentalist and conductor of vocal music, conducting from the keyboard instrument in Baroque practice. He has appeared at international festivals in the United States, Canada and Europe.

He recorded settings by Salamone Rossi, a Jewish composer at the court of the Duke of Mantua, of texts in Hebrew from the Song of Songs in 2012, with New York Baroque, an ensemble of eight singers with continuo. A reviewer noted the performances evoked a certain "flavour of secrecy", fitting music that was "underground" at the time of creation, with little variation in dynamic and tempo.

A reviewer noted his recordings of four Bach cantatas with singers in OVPP fashion and the Montreal Baroque Orchestra, as part of a planned cycle of the works, induced "animated, stylistically assured playing" with "a sure feel for tempo and Bachian rhetoric". Another part of the series, called Cantatas for Mary, and presenting Herz und Mund und Tat und Leben, BWV 147, Ich habe genug, BWV 82, and Wie schön leuchtet der Morgenstern, BWV 1, was reviewed as enlightening, with soloists "whose stylish, energetic singing is a pure joy to hear" and an orchestra with warm, articulate strings and brilliantly resonant trumpet and horns."
