= Paul Benoit (composer) =

Dom Paul Marie-Joseph Benoit, OSB (9 December 1893 – 10 April 1979) was a Benedictine monk, organist, and composer.

== Biography ==
Paul Benoit
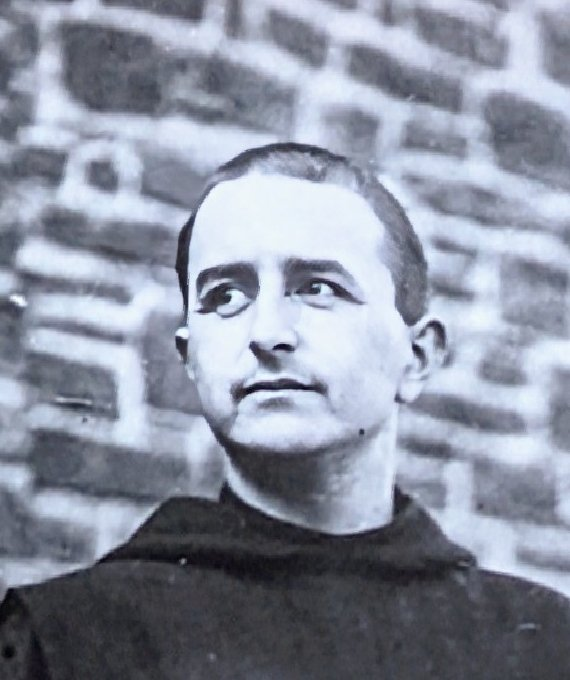
- Born: December 9, 1893; Nancy, France
- Died: April 10, 1979 (aged 85); Luxembourg
- Citizenship: French
- Occupations: Composer, organist
- Style: Sacred music

Paul Benoit was born December 9, 1893, in Nancy, France.

During World War I, Benoit first began to feel called to the vocation of a Benedictine monk. After the Armistice of 1918, he entered a retreat at the Benedictine Abbey of St. Maurice and St. Maur, at Clervaux in Luxembourg, and he joined the abbey in 1919. After taking his vows (1921) and being ordained into priesthood (1926), he was called Dom Paul Benoit. "Dom" is the traditional title given to Benedictines after their vows.

Benoit had begun music lessons at the age of seven, taking piano lessons from his mother. He took organ lessons from Mademoiselle Hess, the daughter of the organist of Notre Dame Cathedral in Nancy. After his priestly ordination, he studied the organ with Albert Leblanc, the former organist of Notre Dame Cathedral in Luxembourg. He then studied with Augustin Pierson, organist at St. Louis Cathedral in Versailles, whose brother was also a monk at Clervaux. There he was introduced to the music of Johann Sebastian Bach and Louis Vierne, who influenced his own work. During that time, he gave organ lessons to organists in the area of Clervaux.

In 1931, Benoit took over as organist of the Mutin-Cavaillé-Coll organ (3 manuals, 20 stops) at the abbey, replacing his predecessor who suffered from health problems. Although he had already composed small pieces as a child, it was at this time that he began composing seriously. In an autobiography, he said that he drew inspiration from J.S. Bach (counterpoint), Louis Vierne (chromaticism), Claude Debussy (free rhythmic structure) and Maurice Ravel (chromaticism). His main source of inspiration was Gregorian chant, which he heard daily in the monastic liturgy. Benoit's compositional style can be described as melodic-pentatonic, with the occasional harmonic influence of Impressionism. He skillfully uses ninths, elevenths, and thirteenths, and the melody is often set against sustained chords. On the advice of his spiritual director, Benoit used his personal prayer time in his monastic cell for composing, because he could be close to God in this way. Benoit composed only for God, and he never performed a public concert.

In 1945, Benoit met Dom Georges Chopiney, who had just moved to the Abbey of Clervaux, and who became his assistant at the organ, and a good friend. Chopiney wrote in his obituary of Benoit that in addition to music, Benoit - much like Olivier Messiaen - had a great love for plants and animals. He liked to take walks in the forest to admire the wetlands and watch animals (birds, butterflies, and even insects.) He was also involved in running a small weather station.

As described by Chopiney, Benoit had a complex personality. On the one hand, he was a shy, sensitive, and timid man, who had a great need for love and appreciation, yet had difficulty relating to other people. On the other hand, he was sometimes jealous and could be very dominant, even authoritarian, although he was fundamentally a deeply humble man. He also had a sentimental streak, with a certain naiveté and enthusiasm. Chopiney concludes his article with the following words: "French: En définitive, Dom Benoît ne fut jamais rien d'autre qu'un enfant. [...] Il avait une âme d'enfant, limpide, naïve et candide." (English: "In the end, Dom Benoit was never anything other than a child [...] He had a child's soul, pure, naive and innocent.")

Benoit died on April 10, 1979, in Clervaux and left behind a great body of work for the organ, much of which has not yet been published.

== Compositions ==
- PB 01 - Élévations pour les Messes IX-X-XI (Combre, Paris)
- PB 02 - Élévations pour la Messe XI (Combre, Paris)
- PB 05 - 2 Fantaisies pour orgue (Combre, Paris)
- PB 08 - 50 Élévations (CPP/Belwin, Miami/London)
- PB 09 - Diptyque en l'honneur de Ste Thérèse (Combre, Paris)
- PB 11 - 7 pièces pour harmonium ou orgue (Combre, Paris)
- PB 15 - 60 Pièces dévotionelles (CPP/Belwin, Miami/London)
- PB 21 - Versets du Magnificat (Art Sacré, Clervaux)
- PB 22 - Pièces d'orgue pour l'année liturgique (Art Sacré, Clervaux) - Réédition de:
  - PB 03 - Au soir de l'Ascension du Seigneur (Fisher & Bro. 7934, 1943)
  - PB 04 - Noël basque (Fisher & Bros. 7961, 1943)
  - PB 06 - 10 petites fugues sur des thèmes liturgiques (Société anonyme Nancy)
  - PB 10 - 4 préludes pour grand orgue (Fisher & Bro. 8509)
  - PB 12 - Pièces d'orgue (Fisher & Bro. 8774)
  - PB 16 - Esquisses liturgiques (Fisher & Bro. 9517)
  - PB 17 - Triptyque pour orgue (pro defunctis)
- PB 23 - (Art Sacré, Clervaux) - Réédition de:
  - PB 07 - Suite liturgique pour Pâques (Fisher & Bro. 8362, 8455, 8359, 8360)
  - PB 19 - Toccata sur "Ite Missa est" VIII
  - PB 20 - Offertoire sur la Séquence "Te Johannes"
- PB 24 - (Art Sacré, Clervaux) - Réédition de:
  - PB 13 - Le Chant intérieur (Fisher & Bro. 8841)
  - PB 14 - 41 Élévations (Fisher & Bro. 8984)
  - PB 18 - Ode pour la paix, pour grand orgue (Fisher & Bro. 9286)
- PB 25 - Noël original avec 6 variations (Art Sacré, Clervaux)
- PB 26 - Nativité et Pâques à l'Abbaye de Clervaux (Art Sacré, Clervaux)
- PB 27 - Consolatrix Afflictorum (Art Sacré, Clervaux), ISBN 2-87996-850-X)
- PB 28 - Livre d'Orgue "Anniversaires 2009" (Art Sacré, Clervaux)
- PB 29 - Stella Maris: Impressions Dominicaines (Art Sacré, Clervaux)

== Arrangements ==
- "Christian Love", hymn tune in common metre, adapted from chant tune for Veni redemptor gentium

[Many of his works remain unpublished.]

== Discography ==
- "Année liturgique" (LP, enregistré à Clervaux par Albert Leblanc, Luxembourg Sound LS 30 721, à l'occasion du cinquantenaire de la pronunciation des vœux)
- "Pâques, Le Chant Intérieur" (CD, enregistré à Clervaux par Carlo Hommel, 1991, K617 France, K6170201991; également contenu dans le coffret "Carlo Hommel" de2006, K617CARLO1-4)
- "Nativité et Pâques" (2 CDs, enregistrés à Clervaux par Carlo Hommel, 2000, K617 France)
- "Consolatrix Afflictorum" (CD, enregistré à Clervaux par Gérard Close, 2007, Art Sacré, RCB01042007)
