= Elvet Banks =

Elvet Banks is a modern hymn tune, in the somewhat unusual meter of 87.87.87.87.7, set in the Lutheran Service Book (LSB) of 2006 for the hymns:

- To Jordan came the Christ, our Lord, recommended for use in Epiphany and set as an alternative to the sixteenth century chorale tune Christ unser Herr
- May God bestow on us His grace, recommended for use in Lent and set as an alternative to the older tune Es Wolle Gott uns gnärdig sein.

The tune was selected for the LSB specifically to make some of these unsung hymns more accessible.

The meter in this tune and its texts is also unusual in that most "8.7.8.7"-derived material (such as in Blaenwern and Hyfrydol) tends to have a strong, trochaic foot, whereas this has a gentler, iambic foot.
