= Veni redemptor gentium =

Christmas hymn by Ambrose of Milan

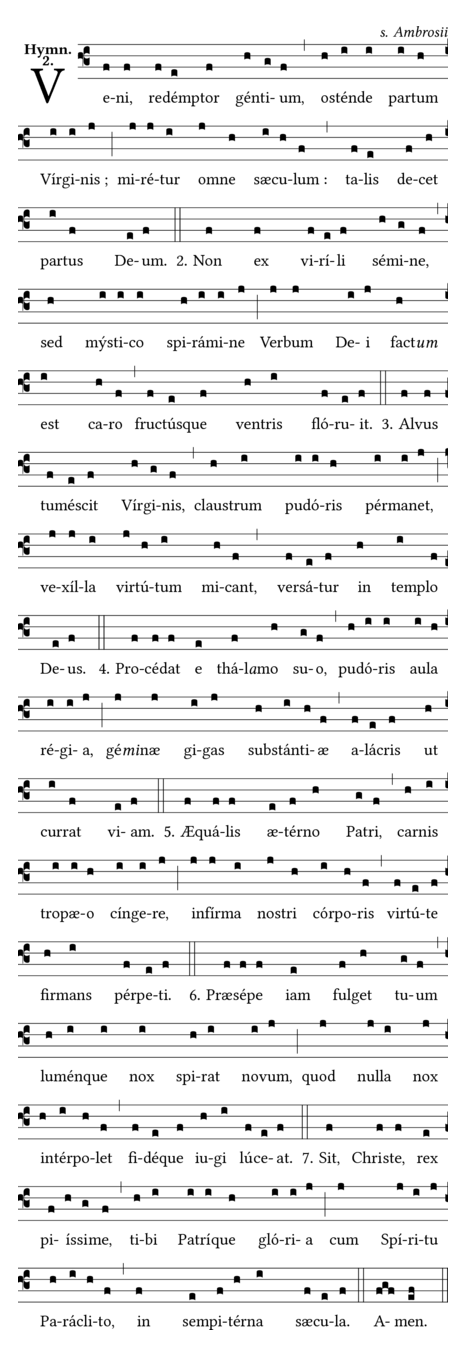
Veni, redemptor gentium, text and Gregorian notation

"Veni redemptor gentium" (Come, Redeemer of the nations) is a Latin Advent or Christmas hymn by Ambrose of Milan in iambic tetrameter. The hymn is assigned to the Office of Readings for Advent, from 17 December through 24 December, in the Liturgy of the Hours. John Mason Neale and Thomas Helmore saw it as an Evening hymn for the period from Christmas to the eve of Epiphany.

== History ==
The later hymn "Veni Creator Spiritus" borrows two lines from the hymn (Infirma nostri corporis — Virtute firmans perpeti). "Veni redemptor gentium" was particularly popular in Germany where Martin Luther translated it into German as "Nun komm, der Heiden Heiland," which then he, or possibly Johann Walter, set as a chorale, based on the original plainchant. Luther adapted the original chant tune separately for each of three other hymns: "Verleih uns Frieden gnädiglich", "Erhalt uns, Herr, bei deinem Wort" and "Gib unserm Fürsten und aller Obrigkeit".

In the mid-nineteenth century, John Mason Neale translated "Veni redemptor gentium" into English as "Come, thou Redeemer of the earth". This text is however more often sung to the tune of Puer nobis nascitur.

In 1959, Dom Paul Benoit, OSB adapted the chant melody as the hymn tune "Christian Love", for use with the text "Where Charity and Love Prevail," Omer Westendorf's common metre translation of the Holy Thursday hymn "Ubi caritas."

== Lyrics ==
Latin	English
1. Veni, redemptor gentium; ostende partum Virginis; miretur omne saeculum: talis decet partus Deum.	Come, thou Redeemer of the earth, and manifest thy virgin-birth: let every age adoring fall; such birth befits the God of all.
2. Non ex virili semine, Sed mystico spiramine Verbum Dei factum caro Fructusque ventris floruit.	Begotten of no human will, But of the Spirit, Thou art still The Word of God in flesh arrayed, The promised fruit to men displayed.
3. Alvus tumescit Virginis, Claustra pudoris permanent, Vexilla virtutum micant, Versatur in templo Deus.	The virgin womb that burden gained With virgin honor all unstained; The banners there of virtue glow; God in His temple dwells below.
4. Procedens de thalamo suo, Pudoris aula regia, Geminae gigas substantiae, Alacris ut currat viam.	Forth from His chamber goeth He, That royal home of purity, A giant in two-fold substance one, Rejoicing now His course to run.
5. Egressus ejus a Patre, Regressus ejus ad Patrem: Excursus usque ad inferos Recursus ad sedem Dei.	From God the Father He proceeds, To God the Father back He speeds; His course He runs to death and hell, Returning on God's throne to dwell.
6. Aequalis eterno Patri, Carnis tropaeo accingere: Infirma nostri corporis Virtute firmans perpeti.	O equal to the Father, Thou! Gird on Thy fleshly mantle now; The weakness of our mortal state With deathless might invigorate.
7. Praesepe jam fulget tuum, Lumenque nox spirat novum, Quod nulla nox interpolet, Fideque jugi luceat.	Thy cradle here shall glitter bright And darkness breathe a newer light, Where endless faith shall shine serene, And twilight never intervene.
8. Sit, Christe, rex piissime, tibi Patrique gloria cum Spiritu Paraclito, in sempiterna saecula.	All praise, eternal Son, to Thee, whose advent sets Thy people free, whom, with the Father, we adore, and Holy Ghost, for evermore.
