= Montreal Baroque Orchestra =

Canadian music ensemble

Montreal Baroque Orchestra (MBO)
- Orchestra
- Founded: 1989 – Present
- Principal conductor: Joël Thiffault

The Montreal Baroque Orchestra (French: Orchestre Baroque de Montréal) is an early music ensemble based in Montreal, Quebec, Canada. It was established in 1989 by conductor Joël Thiffault.

== Discography ==
- Francesco Geminiani - Concertos grossos (1997) Harmonia Mundi - International distributor
- Handel - Ouvertures (1999)
- Naturally Handel (2008)
- Marin Marais - Semele Overture er danses - Montréal Baroque - ATM Baroque (2006)
