= Johann Mayr =

Johann Mayr may refer to:

- Johann Ulrich Mayr, German Baroque painter
- Johann von Mayr (1716–1759), Prussian military officer
