= Free infantry =

Autonomous military units

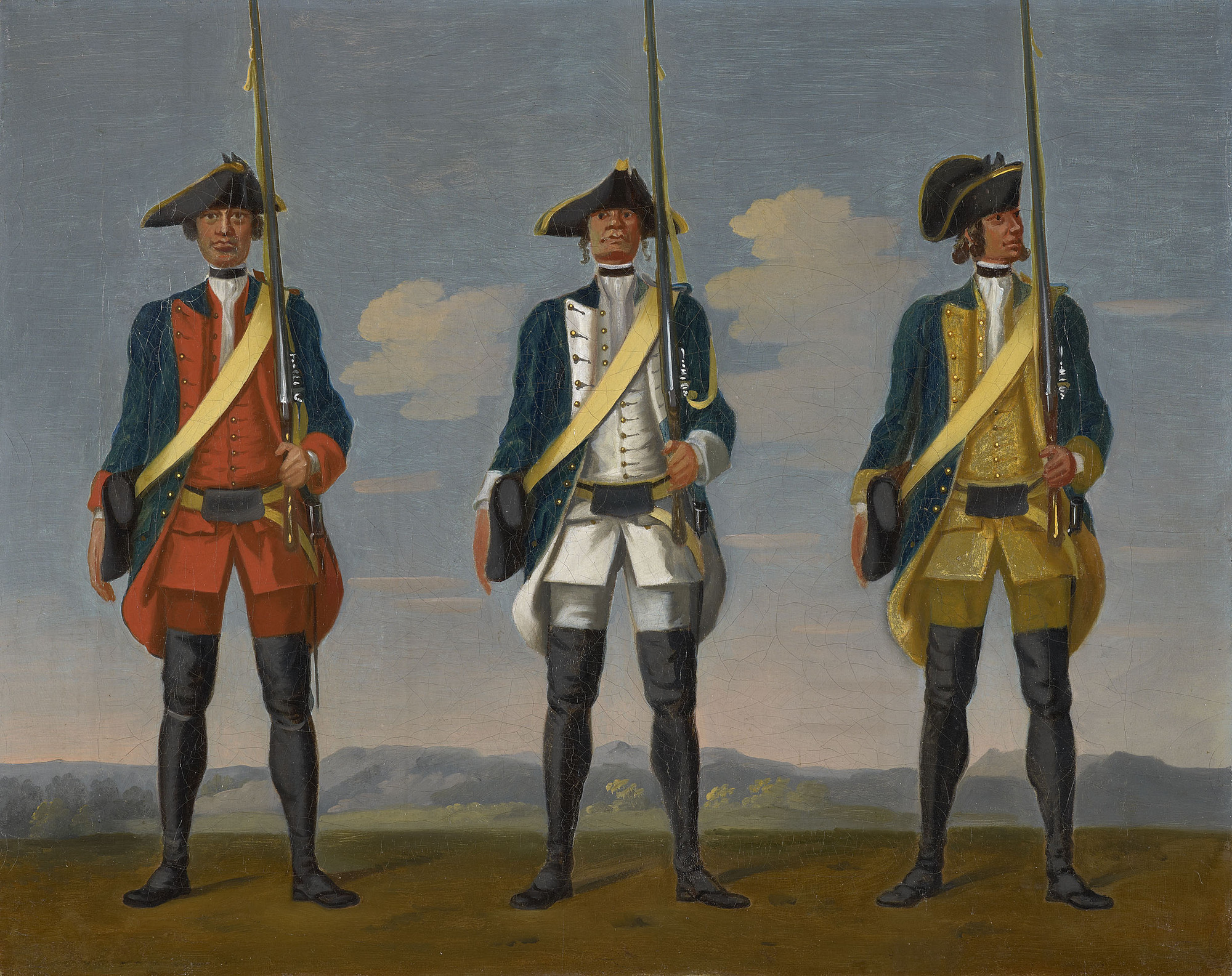
c. 1748 painting of privates of three Austrian free companies

Free infantry (German: Frei-Infanterie) units were autonomous military units established in the second half of the 18th century, which operated as light troops independently of armies using rigid linear tactics. They are not to be confused with the Freikorps. Depending on their size they could be free battalions (Freibataillone) or free companies (Freikompanien).

== Emergence ==
The term Freibataillon emerged in the Holy Roman Empire in the second half of the 17th century for troops formed outside of the regimental system. With the development of linear tactics, light troops were needed for outposts, security and reconnaissance tasks. The soldiers recruited were supposed to be "free" of the normal discipline of the main army.

Pandurs and Croats were used in this way by the Austria in the War of the Austrian Succession. Frederick II was impressed by them and created the Freibatallione, which operated independently and disrupted the enemy with sudden, surprise attacks. They were also used to defend the Pandurs of Maria Theresia. In the Prussian Army, free battalions were often formed from the hussars, jägers and regular infantry and were detachiert, i.e. just detached for the role. A battalion could comprise about 1,000 men, often with a light battery of several guns. In the course of the war, a total of 14 units was established, mostly under the leadership of Huguenot nobles:

- Le Noble (F 1),
- Mayr/Collignon/Courbiere (F 2),
- Kalben/Salenmon (Favrat) (F 3),
- Angelelli/Collignon (F 4),
- Chossignon/Monjou (F 5),
- Rapin/Lüderitz (F 6),
- Wunsch (F 7),
- Du Verger/Quintus Icilius (F 8),
- Hordt (F 9),
- Jeney (Voluntaires d'Ostfrise) (F 10),
- Schack (F 11),
- Heer (Schweizer Volontaires) (F 12),
- Bequignolles (F 13),
- La Badie (Volontaires Etrangers) (F 14).

Particularly well known was the advance of Mayr's Freibataillon (F 2) from Prussian-occupied Electoral Saxony to Franconia in May/June 1757.

With the transfer of the light infantry into line regiments at the end of the 18th century, free battalions disappeared.

== Literature ==
- Hans Bleckwenn: Die friderizianischen Uniformen 1753-1786; 4 Bände; Hardenberg, Dortmund 1984; ISBN 3-88379-444-9. pp. 79ff.
- Franz Fabian: Die Schlacht von Monmouth. Friedrich Wilhelm von Steuben in Amerika. Militärverlag der DDR, 5th edn., Berlin, 1988, ISBN 3-327-00583-4. pp. 23-25
- Wörterbuch zur Deutschen Militärgeschichte. Militärverlag der DDR, Berlin 1985.
- Frank Wernitz: Die preussischen Freitruppen im Siebenjährigen Krieg, 1756–1763. Entstehung, Einsatz, Wirkung. Podzun-Pallas, Wölfersheim-Berstadt, 1994, ISBN 3-7909-0516-X.
