= Siege of Grudziądz (1659) =

1659 siege

- Part of the Second Northern War and The Deluge
Date	August 29–30, 1659
Location	Grudziądz, Poland
Result	Polish–Lithuanian victory

Belligerents
(yes) Swedish Empire	Polish–Lithuanian Commonwealth

Commanders and leaders
(Swedish Empire) Johann Puchert	(Polish–Lithuanian Commonwealth) Jerzy Sebastian Lubomirski (Polish–Lithuanian Commonwealth) Krzysztof Grodzicki

Strength
500 soldiers 500 armed townspeople 30 cannons and 2–3 mortars	12,600 men 30–40 cannons

Casualties and losses
200 killed 300–400 captured	50

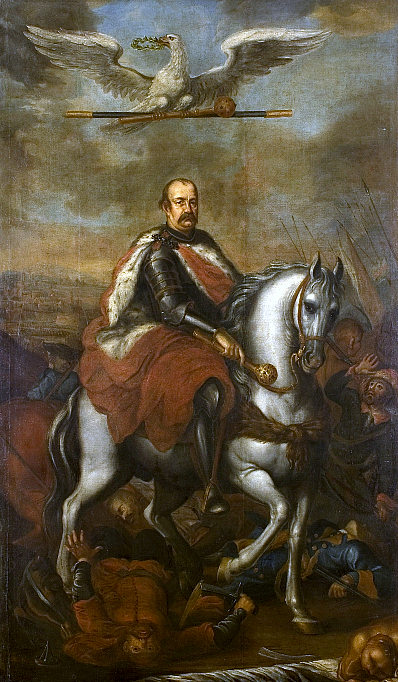
Equestrian portrait of Jerzy Sebastian Lubomirski

The siege of Grudziądz took place in the Polish town of Grudziądz (German: Graudenz) during the Swedish Deluge from 29 to 30 August 1659. Polish forces were commanded either by hetman Jerzy Sebastian Lubomirski or general Krzysztof Grodzicki (sources vary). The battle ended with a Polish victory, after a week-long siege; however much of the city was destroyed in a fire.

== Background ==
Swedes had taken Grudziądz on December 13, 1655, after their failed attempt at conquering Denmark followed by the subsequent march along the Baltic coast. The Swedish troops of King Charles X, went on to build additional fortifications in the town, which were later inspected by the king himself, on his tour of the south coast of the Baltic sea. Polish hetman Stefan Czarniecki – Field Hetman of the Crown of the Polish Kingdom – arrived in Pomorze at the beginning of 1657 with an armed force of about 6,000 cavalrymen ready for the defence of the region, which was part of the Polish–Lithuanian Commonwealth ruled by the Polish King John II Casimir (1648–1668). The battle was fought by the entrenched Swedish units in the town and the surrounding Polish army.

== Siege ==
Along with Stefan Czarniecki arrived the Polish Prince Jerzy Sebastian Lubomirski – Field Crown Hetman since 1658, who approached Grudziądz Fortress in mid-August. (While some sources name Lubomirski the commander, others name general Krzysztof Grodzicki). Poles gave the Swedes an opportunity to surrender, but expecting to be relieved, they refused. After a week-long siege the Poles defeated the Swedes on 29–30 August 1659. Much of the city was destroyed in a fire.

The campaign was won also thanks to the devotion of local government (Starostwo) and Marie Louise Gonzaga who raised the sum of 1,415 Polish zloty to pay for the maintenance of the army.

== See also ==
- Siege of Graudenz
- Battle of Grudziądz
