= Line regiment =

Regiments that did not have specialized roles

The line regiments formed the majority of the regiments in European standing armies in the early 20th century. These were all the regiments that did not have a specialist role - such as guards regiments. They are also often referred to as regiments of the line or, depending on the branch, as "infantry of the line", "line cavalry", etc.

For example, in the Austro-Hungarian Empire, the line regiments did not include the guards regiments, the Landwehr, Landsturm or irregular light troops. When light infantry, that hitherto had been organised in small units like the free battalions (Freibataillone), became part of the line troops, and the Landwehr, national guards and the like became part of the warfighting army, the term "line regiment" was used to distinguish the standing, active, regular units from the rest.

There were line regiments in the infantry (line infantry), cavalry, and artillery. They usually made up the main body of an army's strength.

== Examples ==
=== Cavalry ===
In the British Army during the late 19th century and First World War, the Line Cavalry Regiments were the regiments of the Dragoon Guards, Dragoons, Hussars, and Lancers.

In the Napoleonic Wars, the French Army had up to 30 regiments of dragoons which comprised the "cavalry of the line".

== See also ==
- Line infantry
