= Braunsbedra =

- Town
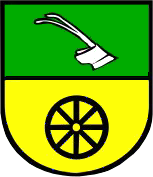
- Coat of arms

- Location of Braunsbedra within Saalekreis district
- Interactive map of Braunsbedra
- Location within Germany Location within Saxony-Anhalt
- Coordinates: 51°17′N 11°54′E
- Country: Germany
- State: Saxony-Anhalt
- District: Saalekreis
- Subdivisions: 13

Government
  - Mayor (2022–29): Steffen Schmitz (CDU)

Area
  - Total: 74.32 km^{2} (28.70 sq mi)
- Elevation: 104 m (341 ft)

Population (2025-12-31)
  - Total: 10,234
  - Density: 137.7/km^{2} (356.6/sq mi)
- Time zone: UTC+01:00 (CET)
  - Summer (DST): UTC+02:00 (CEST)
- Postal codes: 06242
- Dialling codes: 034633
- Vehicle registration: SK
- Website: www.braunsbedra.de

Braunsbedra (German pronunciation: [bʁaʊnsˈbeːdʁaː]) is a town in the Saalekreis district, in Saxony-Anhalt, Germany. It is situated approximately 11 km southwest of Merseburg.

It was created after 1945 by the merger of Braunsdorf and Bedra. The town Braunsbedra consists of Braunsbedra proper and four Ortschaften (municipal divisions): Frankleben, Großkayna, Krumpa and Roßbach.

Roßbach, famous for the Battle of Rossbach, is one of the local communities; the layout of the land had greatly changed since the battle due to lignite mining and then flooding of the abandoned mines to create the Geisel valley Lakes complex.

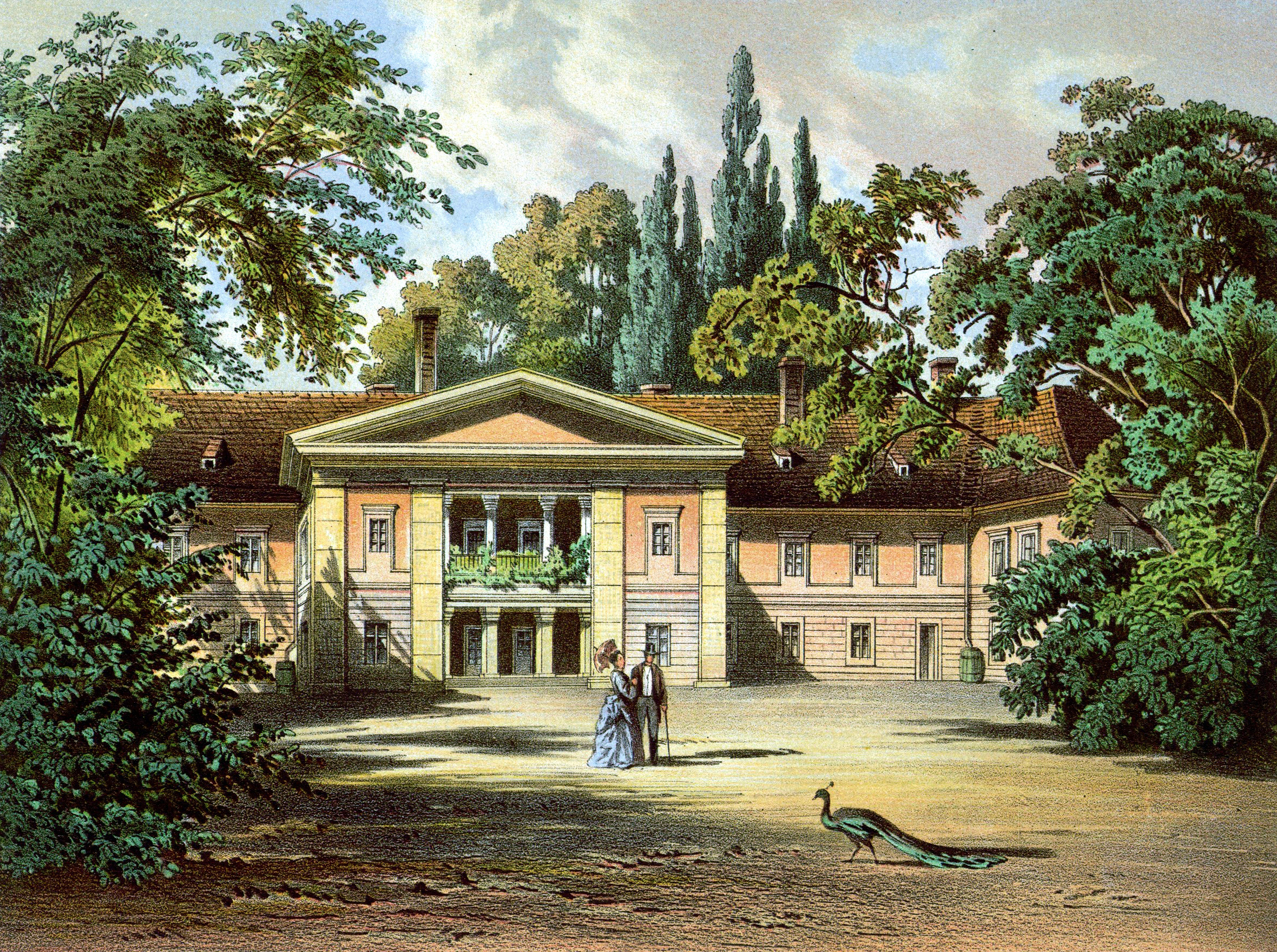
Palace Bedra, around 1860, Edition by Alexander Duncker

== People ==
- Otto von Helldorff (1833-1908), German politician and landowner
