= Siege of Graudenz =

1807 siege during the War of the Fourth Coalition

- Part of the War of the Fourth Coalition
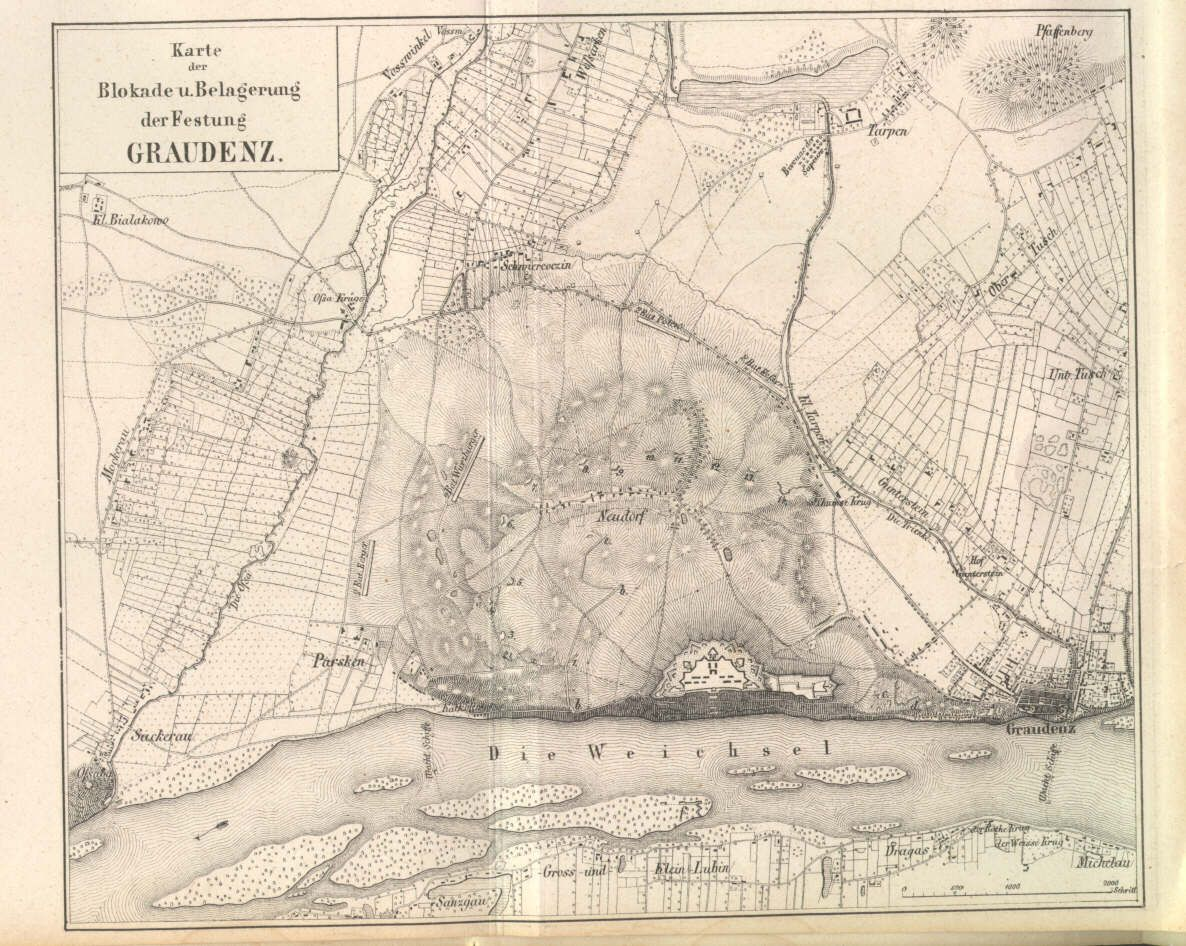
- Map of the siege of Graudenz in 1807
Date	22 January – 11 December 1807
Location	Graudenz, Prussian Partition of Poland (now Grudziądz, Poland) 53°29′33″N 18°46′34″E
Result	Prussian victory

Belligerents
(First French Empire) French Empire: Grand Duchy of Hesse; Electorate of Saxony; (Poland) Polish insurgents	Kingdom of Prussia

Commanders and leaders
(First French Empire) Marie François Rouyer (First French Empire) Claude-Victor Perrin (Grand Duchy of Hesse) Johann Georg Schäffer von Bernstein (Electorate of Saxony) Georg Friedrich August von Polenz	(Kingdom of Prussia) Wilhelm René de l'Homme de Courbière

Strength
Variable; 7,000	4,500–5,709 men

Casualties and losses
Unknown	761 dead 88 captured 53 missing 826 deserted

War of the Fourth Coalition
⬤ current battle
⬤ Napoleon not in command
⬤ Napoleon in command

The siege of Graudenz or siege of Grudziądz was a siege during the Napoleonic Wars between 22 January and 11 December, 1807. As part of the War of the Fourth Coalition the Prussian fortress at Graudenz in West Prussia in the Prussian Partition of Poland (now Grudziądz, Poland) was besieged by forces of the French Empire and its allies. The garrison, commanded by General Wilhelm René de l'Homme de Courbière, withheld blockade and siege for some 11 months, long past the formal Peace of Tilsit. The French abandoned the siege after the borders between Prussia and the new Duchy of Warsaw were defined; Graudenz/Grudziądz staying a Prussian possession until Poland regained independence after World War I.

The Polish 2nd, 4th and 7th Infantry Regiments took part in the battle on the side of Napoleon.

== See also ==
- Battle of Grudziądz
- Battle of Grudziądz (1659)
