= David Bayne Horn =

British historian (1901–1969)

David Bayne Horn (1901–1969) was a British historian specializing in diplomatic and European history of the 17th through 19th centuries.

== Biography ==
Horn was born on 9 July 1901. His uncle, also David Bayne Horn (1851–1917?), had been assigned to the Public Works Department in Bengal.

Horn was educated first at Edinburgh Institution, then studied at Edinburgh University, where he earned a first class honors degree in history. He subsequently received his MA in 1922.

In 1923, Horn joined the staff of the History Department of the university as an Assistant in History. In 1927 he became a lecturer in history, and in 1929, he was awarded the degree of D.Litt. at the university for his thesis on Sir Charles Hanbury Williams and European diplomacy. In 1954, he became Professor of Modern History.

A writer as well as a lecturer, Horn's main interest lay in the field of 18th century diplomatic history and, in particular, 18th century British foreign policy. In his research, he reconstructed the social and political lives of diplomats and envoys through their private and public papers.

In 1967 he wrote a short history of the University of Edinburgh; when he died on 7 August 1969, Horn was engaged in writing a full-length history.

== Selected publications ==
- A History of Europe, 1871-1920 (1927)
- Sir Charles Hanbury Williams & European Diplomacy (1747-58) (1930)
- British Diplomatic Representatives, 1689-1789 (1932)
- Scottish Diplomatists, 1689-1789 (1944)
- British Public Opinion and the First Partition of Poland (1945)
- British Diplomatic Service, 1689-1789 (1961)
- Frederick the Great and the Rise of Prussia (1964)
- Great Britain and Europe in the Eighteenth Century (1967)
