= Wilhelm René de l'Homme de Courbière =

Prussian field marshal

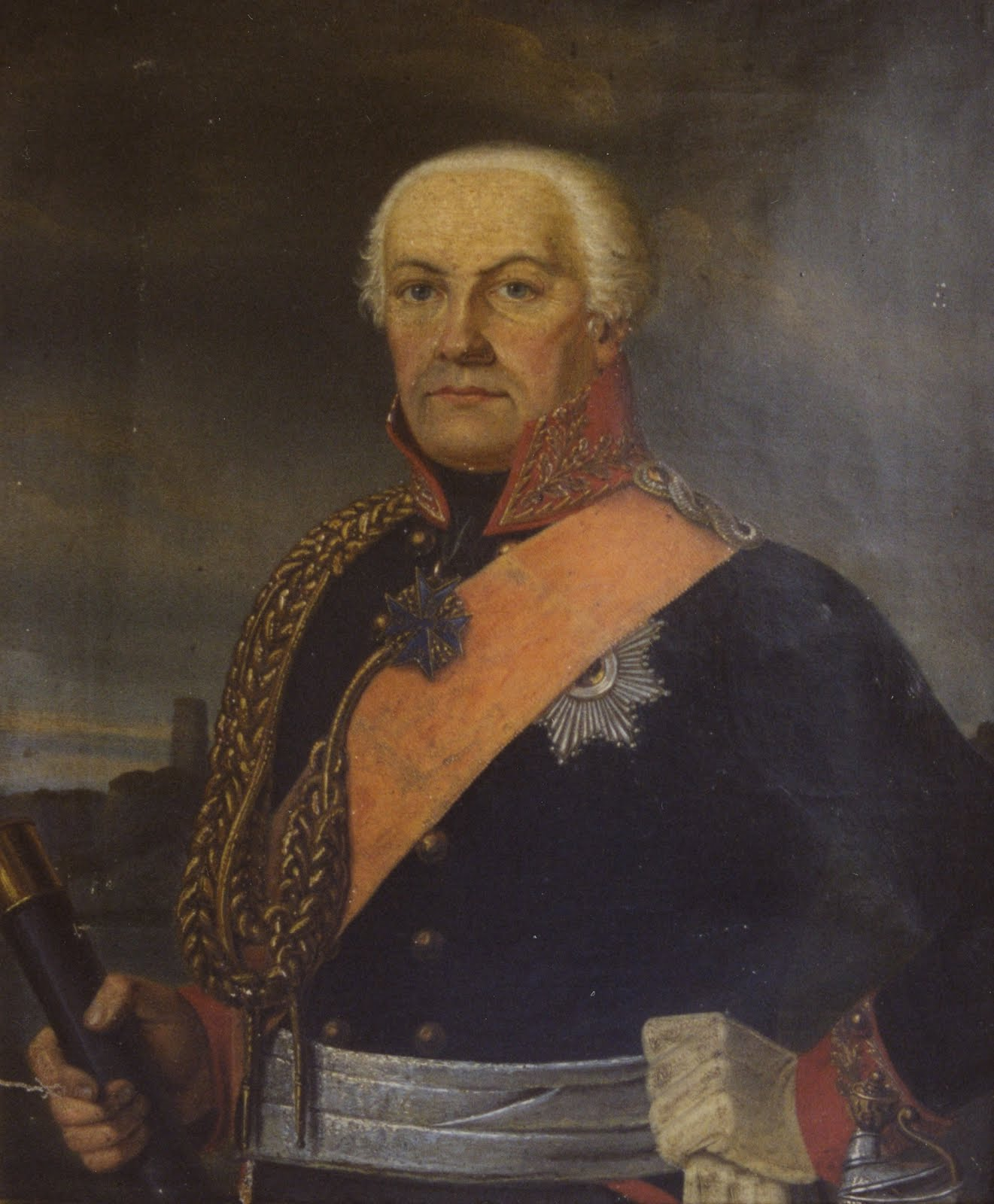
- Born: Guillaume René de l'Homme, Seigneur de Courbière; 25 February 1733; Maastricht, Dutch Republic
- Died: 23 July 1811 (aged 78); Graudenz, Kingdom of Prussia
- Military career
- Allegiance: Dutch Republic; Prussia
- Branch: Dutch States Army; Prussian Army
- Service years: 1746–1753; 1757–1811
- Rank: Generalfeldmarschall
- Conflicts: War of the Austrian Succession; Seven Years' War; Third Silesian War; Pomeranian War; French Revolutionary Wars; Napoleonic Wars; War of the Fourth Coalition; Siege of Graudenz
- Awards: Pour le Merite; Order of the Black Eagle; Order of the Red Eagle

Wilhelm René de l'Homme de Courbière (25 February 1733 – 23 July 1811) was a Dutch-born military officer who served in the Dutch States Army and the Prussian Army. Born into a Dutch-Huguenot family; he notably held the fortress of Graudenz against Napoleon's troops throughout 1807, long past the Peace of Tilsit, until the siege was finally lifted after 11 months.

== Early life ==
Wilhelm René (Note: While originally named Guillaume René, the Germanised version is Wilhelm Reinhard. He is mostly referred to in the combined form of Wilhelm René.) de l'Homme de Courbière was born on 25 February 1733 into a Franco-Dutch family, paternally expatriates from the Dauphiné province, in Maastricht in the Dutch Republic. Following his father, Alexis Baron de l’Homme de Courbière, young Courbière joined the Dutch States Army in 1746. He served with the Regiment d’Aylva in the War of the Austrian Succession, participating in the defense of Bergen op Zoom. He left Dutch service in 1753 and entered the Prussian Army as a company commander in 1757. Then he served in the Third Silesian and Pomeranian wars. Gaining the attention of King Frederick the Great, after the Siege of Schweidnitz (1758) he was given the rank of Major and command of a free battalion. After the Siege of Dresden he received the Pour le Mérite. He also fought at Liegnitz and Torgau.

== Prussian service ==
When the war ended he stayed in the army as garrison commander at Emden. In 1766 Courbière married Sophie von Weiss. The couple, married until her death in 1809, had nine children. Among the latters' private teachers was Johann Gottfried Seume. Courbière was a known duellist, fighting at least two duels during his time in Emden. Among Courbière's descendants was René de l'Homme de Courbière, who served as Generalleutnant in the Wehrmacht during World War II. Wilhelm René de l'Homme de Courbière was made a Generalmajor in 1780 and was a Generalleutnant when the French Revolutionary Wars began. In those he led formations at Verdun and Pirmasens, receiving the Order of the Red Eagle for the later. Then he became a corps commander and in 1798 he was promoted to General der Infanterie. In 1802 he was bestowed with the knighthood of the Order of the Black Eagle.

== Napoleonic Wars ==
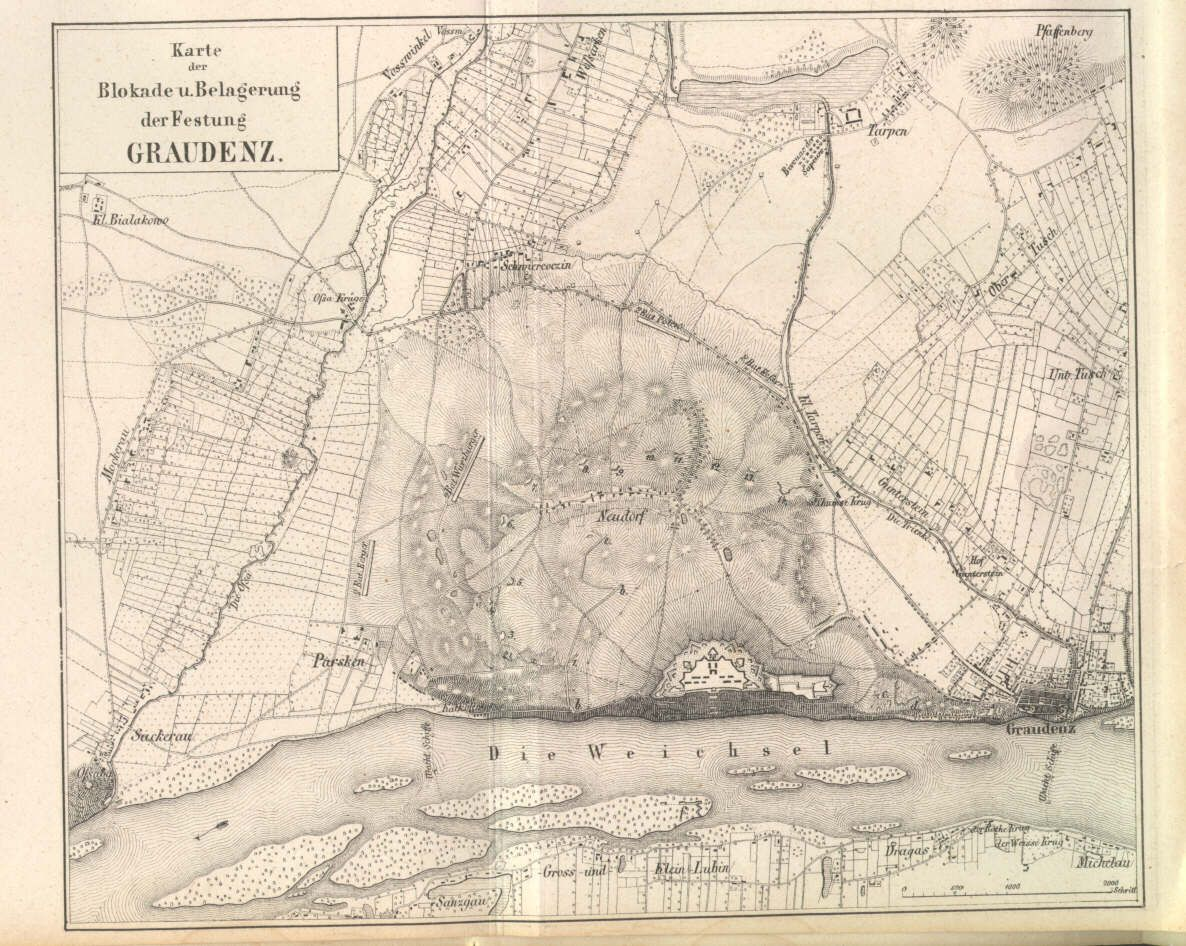
The city and fortress of Graudenz along the Vistula river

In 1803 he was made governor and garrison commander at Graudenz, a fortress and city along the Vistula in West Prussia. During the War of the Fourth Coalition much of Prussia was occupied after the Battle of Jena–Auerstedt and the Fall of Berlin in 1806. King Frederick William III of Prussia himself relocated to East Prussia, staying at Graudenz for a day during his journey. While in the follow-up months many isolated Prussian fortresses and detachments surrendered or dissolved, Courbière and his roughly 5,700-strong garrison stood firm on 22 January 1807, when French troops took the city of Graudenz and began blockading the fortress. The French forces consisted of French and Hessian troops as well as contingents of Polish insurgents. Initially commanded by General Marie François Rouyer, their numerous demands to surrender were refused by Courbière. Then, after briefly leaving the field, they reoccupied the city and, by now commanded by General Johann Georg von Schäffer-Bernstein, started besieging the fortress again. In March Napoleon, impending to besiege Danzig (situated down on the end of the Vistula), sent General Anne Jean Marie René Savary to demand surrender again. In one of his depeches Savary argued that there was no King of Prussia anymore as he had left his lands in French hands. However, in reference to King Frederick William Courbière refused to surrender and verbally answered "While there may be no King of Prussia anymore there still is a King of Graudenz.", though the exact wording or meaning is somewhat disputed. (Note: The reply, made in French, has been given as Eh bien, ça se peut; mais s’il n’y a plus un Roi de Prusse, il existe encore un roi de Graudenz. or alternatively as Eh bien, ça se peut; mais s’il n’y a plus un Roi de Prusse, il existe au moins un roi de Graudenz; with some thinking that King of Graudenz was meant to refer to Courbière himself.) In the following months the siege was intensified, the French got more reinforcements and after Danzig fell command was briefly given to Claude Victor-Perrin, Duc de Belluno before Rouyer took over again.

Graudenz was still in Prussian hands when the Peace of Tilsit was signed on 9 July, however Courbière did not receive confirmation of this until 27 July. Enclosed in the official dispatch was a royal commission promoting him to Generalfeldmarschall. Meanwhile, the French, against the statutes of the signed treaty, upheld their blockade of the fortress and continued to occupy the area; their troops now consisted mainly of Saxons under General Georg Friedrich August von Polenz. After the borders between Prussia and the new Duchy of Warsaw were finally set, with Graudenz remaining Prussian territory, on 12 December the blockade was lifted and the last French troops left the city. The siege had ended after 313 days with some 3,140 men remaining in the garrison.

== Later life and legacy ==
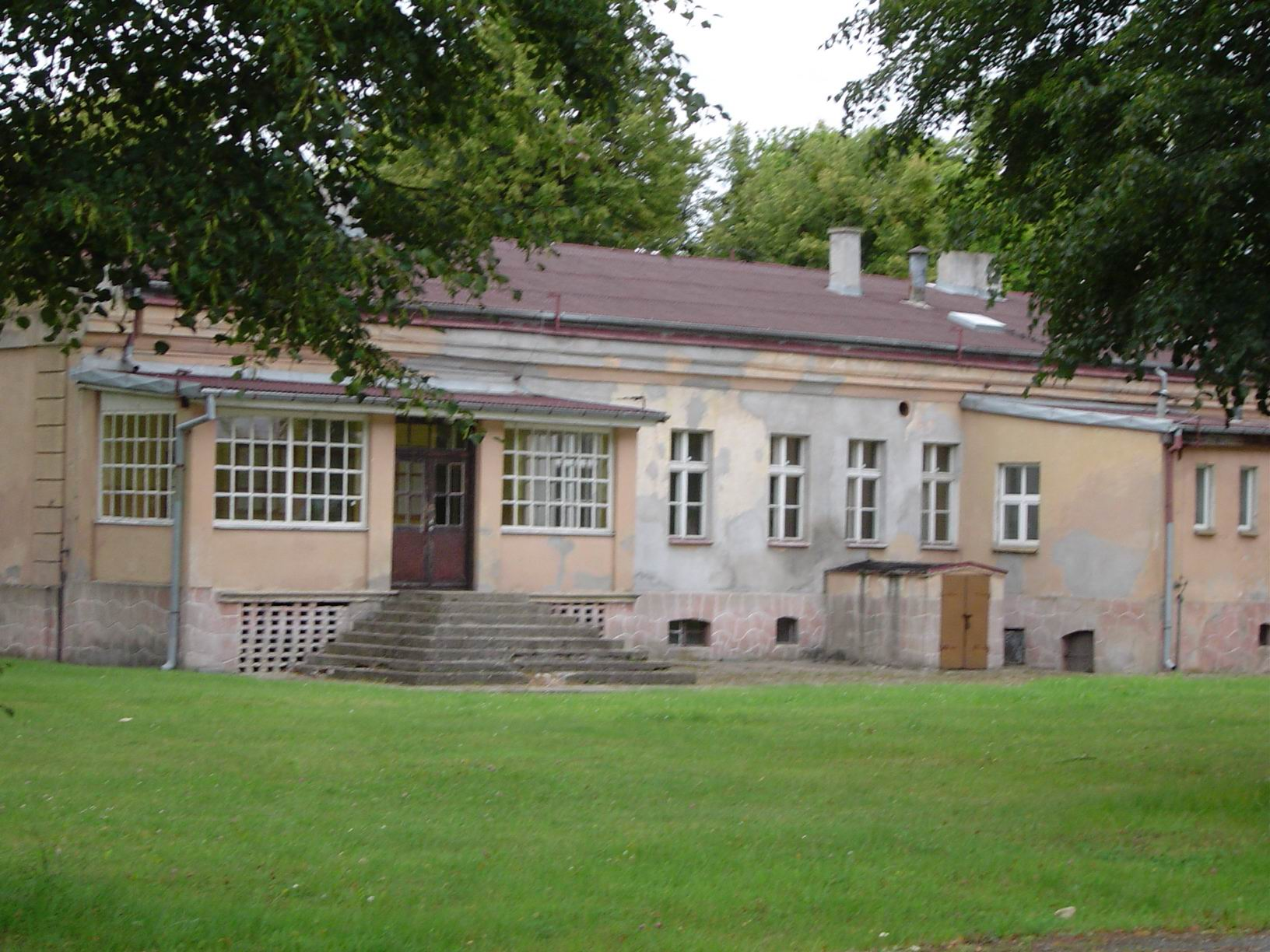
Courbiere's house within the citadel at Graudenz

Afterwards Courbière was named governor general of West Prussia and kept his official residence in Graudenz. He died there on 23 July 1811 and was laid to rest in the garden of the fortress headquarters.

The general was the namesake of two regiments; the 58th Infantry Regiment "von Courbière", which eventually became the 7th (2nd West Prussian) Grenadier Regiment "King William I", and decades later the 19th (2nd Posen) Infantry Regiment "von Courbière". Likewise the fortress he defended carried his name from 1893 until it became a Polish possession in 1920 after World War I. His monument there was removed in the same year. He also was the namesake of streets in Emden and Berlin as well as a square in the latter.

== See also ==
- List of German field marshals
- List of the Pour le Mérite (military class) recipients
