= Krzysztof Grodzicki =

Polish artillery general

Krzysztof Grodzicki (died 1659) was a Polish artillery general, serving the Polish–Lithuanian Commonwealth.

Grodzicki underwent military education in the Dutch Republic. He served under Stanisław Koniecpolski in the Polish–Swedish War (1626–29). He served as Commandant of Kodak Fortress from 1640 to 1648, but was taken prisoner while defending it against Bohdan Khmelnytsky in 1648, and was held for two years. He served as General of Artillery during the Russo-Polish War, from 1653 to 1655. During the Deluge he defended Lviv against Swedish armies in 1655, and also fought the Swedes in the vicinity of Warsaw and Gdańsk, and in Pomerania.
