= Pettstädt =

Coordinates: 51°14′12″N 11°52′52″E

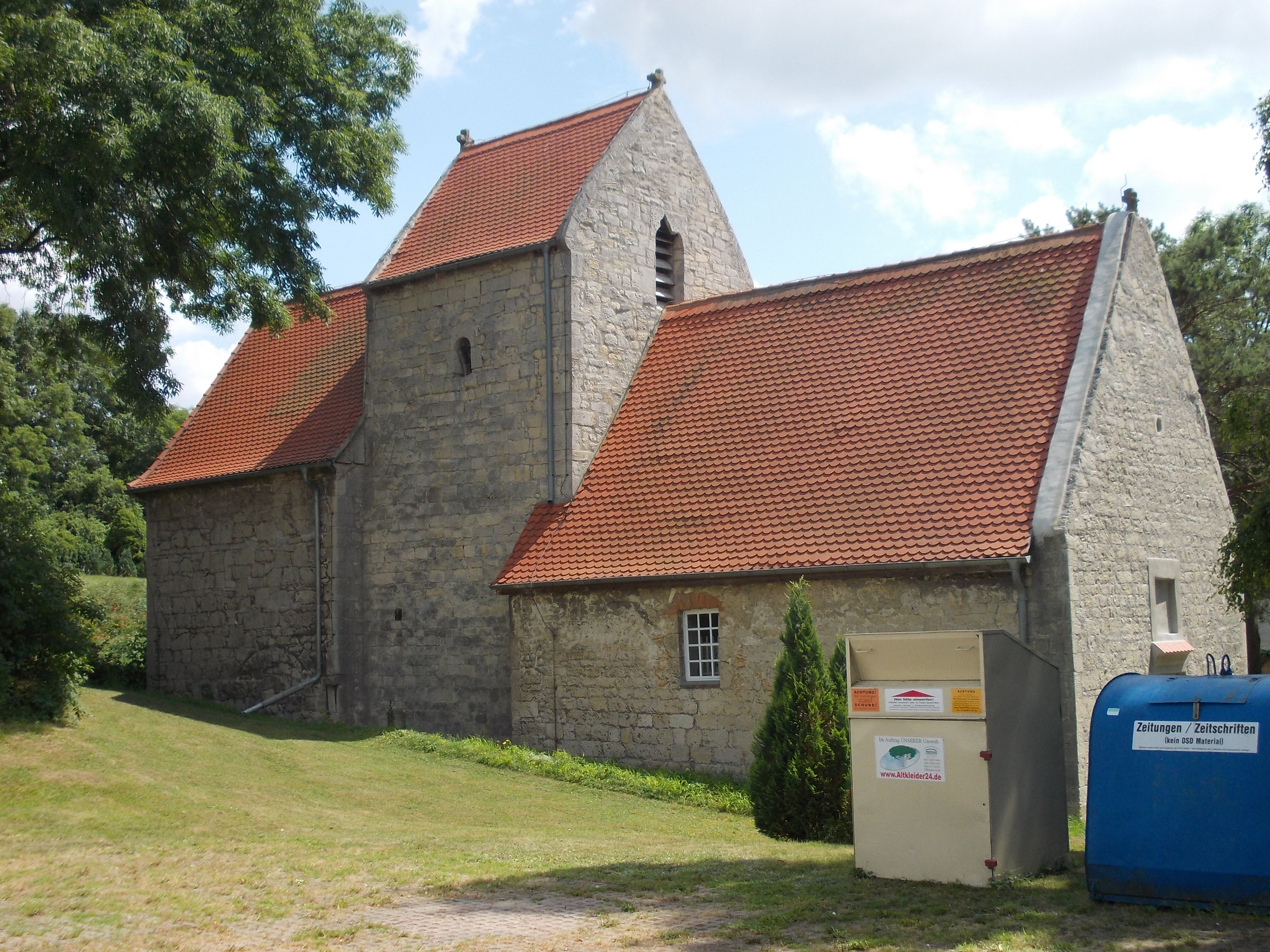
Pilgrim Church of St. Anna, in Pettstädt.

Pettstädt, formally an independent official village in the Duchy of Saxony, is presently a portion of the city of Weißenfels in the Burgenlandkreis of Sachsen-Anhalt.

== History ==
The hamlet, originally described as Böttstedt in 1589, was a village of the Duchy of Saxony. Nineteen property-owning men and their families lived there, plus six journeymen and apprentices. The hamlet was bordered by a village mill creek and Markröhlitz stream. The roadway to Halle connected Obschütz and Roßbach, separated by the Merseburg, as well as Almsdorf and Leiha. Prussian annexed the village in 1815, and in 1816, it was assigned to the district of Querfurt, to which it belonged until 1950. On 1 July 1950, the village was integrated into Storkau.

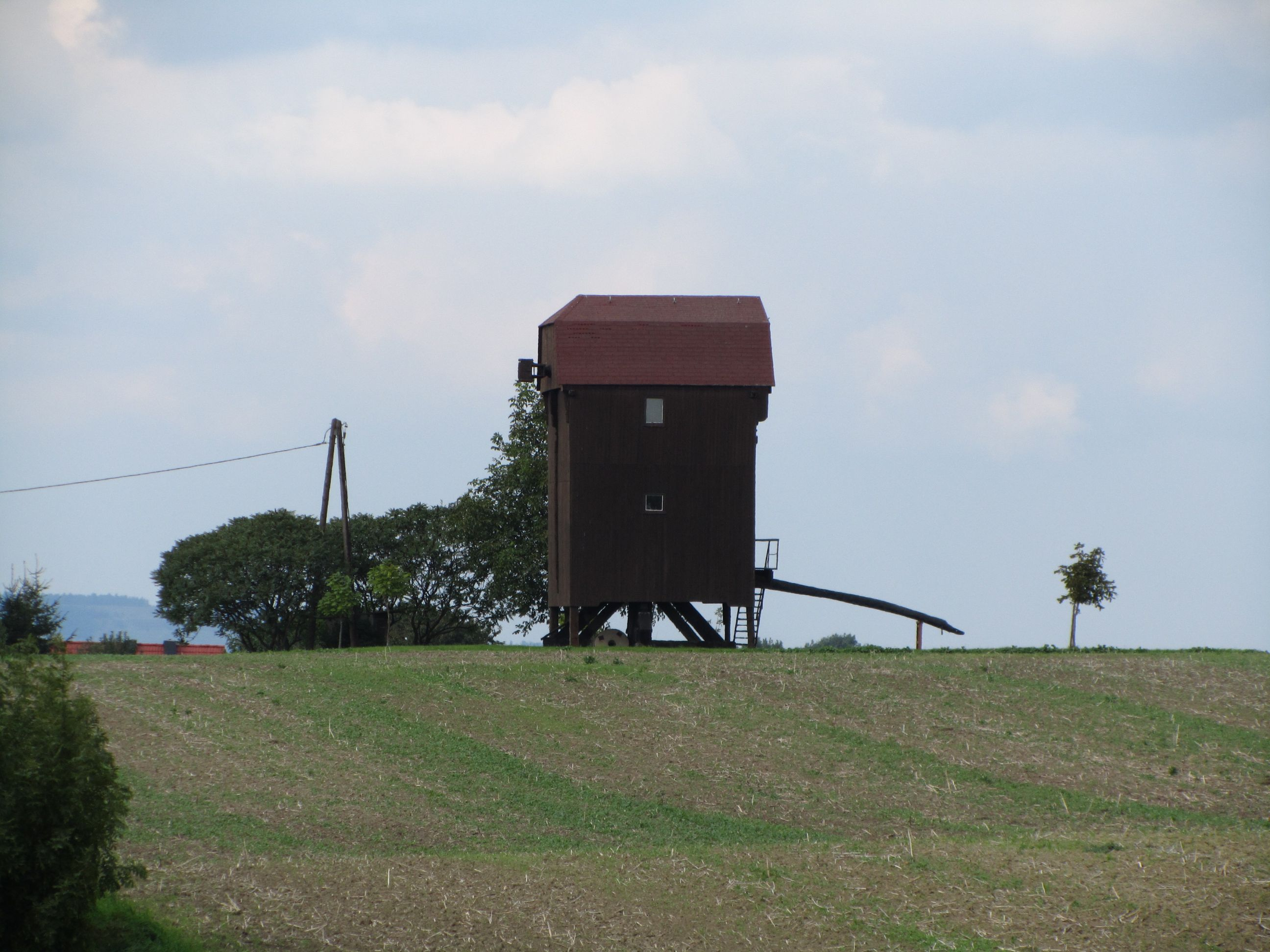
Pettstädt windmill

Pettstädt lies on the old Pilgrim (St Jacob's) way. The Church of St. Anna lays directly on the pathway, and was in the process of renovation in 2009. It has two gothic windows and a round Roman tower window. The Glass was made by the Weissenfelser artist Christina Simon. The name patrons of the church and the pilgrim path are St. Anna and Saint Jacob the Elder.

On 1 September 2010, Pettstädt, as a division of the village of Storkau, was joined with the larger town of Weißenfels.
