= Mihály Lajos Jeney =

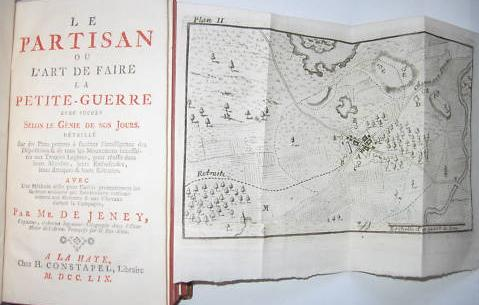
de Jeney: Le Partisan ou l`art de faire la petite-guerre avec succés selon le génie de nos jours – title page from first French edition published at The Hague in 1759

Mihály Lajos Jeney (also known as French author: Louis Michel de Jeney or English name as: Lewis Michael de Jeney or as German combat commander Ludwig Michael von Jeney – b. 1723 or 1724 in Transylvania, d. 1797 in Pécs) – Hungarian military officer and general of Imperial Army (Holy Roman Empire), cartographer. He was born in noble Protestant family. He started in military service as ahussar probably during 1737–1739 war against the Turkey, on 1739–1754 served in Bercsényi hussar regiment. Between 1754 and 1758 served in French army near Rhine as a cartographer. During Seven Years' War 1758–1763 served in Prussian Army as captain of military engineers. On 1787 nominated as major-general of Imperial Army as Alt-Gradisko (now: Stara Gradiška in Croatia) fortress commander. Author of popular manual of tactics: The Partisan, or the Art of Making War in Detachment... published in 1759 (French edition: The Hague) and English edition: London 1760, translated into many languages. After Seven Years' War he provide military survey of Hungarian-Austrian Kingdom and result were 3324 sheets of topographic maps 1:28 000 and 1:96 000.

== Bibliography ==
- Jankó, Annamária: An outstanding person of the 1st military survey: Mihály Lajos Jeney. Budapest: War History Institute and Museum.

== de Jeney's "The Partisan" in translations ==
- de Jeney, L. M. [Louis Michel]: Le Partisan ou l'art de faire la petite-guerre avec succès selon le génie de nos jours. Détaillé Sur des Plans propres à faciliter l'intelligence des Dispositions & de tous les Mouvemens nécessaires aux Troupes Legères, pour réussir dans leurs Marches, leurs Embuscades, leurs Attaques & leurs Rétraites. Avec une Méthode aisée pour Guérir promptement les facheux accidens qui surviennent ordinairement aux Hommes & aux Chevaux durant la Campagne, Par Mr. de Jeney, Capitaine, ci-devant Ingenieur-Géographe dans l'Etat-major de l'Armée Françoise sur le Bas-Rhin. Constapel: La Haye, 1759. (French edition)
- de Jeney, L. M. [Lewis Michael]: The Partisan, or the Art of Making War in Detachment..."translated from the French of Mr. de Jeney, by an Officer of the Army" [Thomas Ellis]. London: 1760.
- de Jeney: Partyzant, czyli sztuka prowadzenia pomyślnie woyny podjazdowey, według zwyczaju wieku teraźnieyszego.. Supraśl: X.X. Bazylianie, 1770. (Polish edition)
- de Jeney: A portyázó, avagy a kisháború sikerrel való megvívásának mestersége korunk géniusza szerint. Hága, 1759 (edi. József Zachar). Budapest: Magvető Kiadó, 1986. (Hungarian edition)
