= Johann von Mayr =

German soldier

- Born: 1 May 1716; Vienna
- Died: 5 January 1759 (aged 42); Plauen
- Military career
- Allegiance: Habsburg Empire 1732–1747; Duchy of Saxony 1747–1755; Kingdom of Prussia (1744–1762)
- Branch: Prussian Army
- Service years: 1732–1759
- Rank: Major General
- Conflicts: War of the Austrian Succession: Siege of Prague (1742); Battle of Mollwitz; Battle of Kesselsdorf; Siege of Bergen op Zoom (1747); Seven Years' War: Siege of Prague (1757); Battle of Rossbach

Johann von Mayr (Note: His name is also spelled Mayer, Maier and Meyer.) (1 May 1716 – 5 January 1759) was a Prussian military officer. He was the head of a Prussian Freibataillon ("F 2") that, during the Seven Years' War, formed part of the advanced guard of Frederick the Great's Prussian Army.

== Early life ==
Johann von Mayr was born on 1 May 1716 in Vienna. He was a natural son of Count von Stella, a royal Spanish councilor in Vienna. His mother was from the bourgeois class and married the owner of a billiard parlor named Mayr soon after. He was enrolled in a school organized by Jesuits, where they developed his natural talent for music. Eventually his propensity for trouble and his debauchery led the city of Vienna to expel him, and, in, 1732, he traveled to Hungary. There, he supported himself through his violin, and his music so intrigued the commandant of Temesvar, the General von Engelshofen, that he took Mayr in.

== Military career ==
At about twenty years of age, at last he decided to become a soldier and entered the officially into the Duke of Lorraine's regiment, in which he ultimately became a sergeant. The life of soldiers – at no time a restrained one – also led him to excesses in the enjoyment, drinking and love, which at last followed a serious life-threatening illness. There he fell into a melancholy during which he stabbed himself with a bread-knife. In the then war of Austria with the Turks, Mayr fought several battles and received several wounds from 1736 to 1739. After the death of the Emperor Charles VI, during the War of Austrian Succession, he also fought in the Battle of Mollwitz, and then at the Siege of Prague, after which he was taken prisoner by the French on 26 November 1741. Mayr bought himself out the French captivity and returned to the imperial service. General-Field Marshal Friedrich Heinrich von Seckendorff took him into his entourage as lieutenant and adjutant, as Mayr proved to be useful and skilled. He remained in this service, until trouble with his colonel, the Claude Louis, Comte de Saint-Germain, caused him to leave. He wanted to go into Prussian service, but his patron, General Seckendorff, advised him to go to Saxony instead, and gave him recommendations to Dresden, where Mayr went in 1744.

=== Saxon service ===
The Saxon court gave him a commission, and in 1745 he fought in the Battle of Kesselsdorf as a dragoon. Subsequently, he went to the Netherlands as Count Károly József Batthyány's adjutant. In this position, Mayr distinguished himself on several occasions, such as in the siege of Bergen op Zoom, which was overwhelmed on 16 September 1747. In that year he was also appointed Rittmeister (captain of cavalry) in the Saxon army. At this time, several regiments had been disbanded in Saxony, and many officers were placed on half-pay; Mayr recognized the limitations of service in Saxony. He was one of the younger and newer officers and advancement would be hard to acquire. He remained in the service of Field Marshal Count Batthyany until the conclusion of the Peace of Aachen in 1748.

Bethanny appreciated Mayer's skills, and Mayr was close to an appointment as a colonel in the Dutch Guard but intrigues thwarted this project. Mayr lingered for a while in Holland, then went to Aachen, and finally returned to Dresden in 1750, where he was appointed colonel in the Saxon-Polish Army. In 1754, he quarreled with the colonel Georg Friedrich Vitzthum von Eckstädt, who was acting as adjutant to the Elector of Saxony. The two men dueled, and the colonel was mortally wounded. Mayr had to flee, and at first went to Silesia, with the decision to enter foreign services. From Silesia, Mayr went to Warsaw, where his duel history was investigated, and he was cleared.

Subsequently, Mayr tried to enter Russian service. He went first to Potsdam and Königsberg to Mitau in Courland, but while there, he found a letter from King Frederick II of Prussia, who had been drawn to him, knew of his qualities, and invited him to Potsdam. After an interview with the king, Frederick found the proper niche for him; Mayr served as a wing adjutant in Frederick's service, in which he remained until his death.

=== Prussian Service ===
As a lieutenant colonel, the King charged Mayr with the development of light troops specifically modeled on the Pandours of the Austrian military. Mayr established Freiberg in Saxony as the headquarters for his Freibataillon. Such formations were, at the time, comparable to what the privateer was in a navy. They operated outside the normal channels of military organization, and were considerably freer from much of the military's monotony and, in Prussia, extraordinary, discipline. Freibatallions generally attracted the young, the reckless, and often, those who had the least to lose. The battalion was built partly from Saxon unemployed soldiery, which was considerable. On 28 May 1756, Mayr was able to searched houses for Saxon deserters in Freiberg, and within a month his unit was mostly formed.

Mayr became famous mainly for his razzias from the Prussian-occupied Saxony to Franconia in May through June 1757. Although he had only 1500 men of foot, 300 hussars and five guns, he caused considerable havoc. His route led him through Pilsen, Vilseck, the Imperial city of Nuremberg to the Bavarian Fürth, which was plundered, and on to Fränkische Schweiz. He gathered great numbers of hostages and wagonloads of provisions, weapons, and armaments.

The battalion distinguished itself in preliminary maneuvers to the Battle of Rossbach; he took Weißenfels in the first days of November, and forced the defenders to flee; a few days later, he and his company took their share of the spoils in the Battle of Rossbach, on 5 November, when he first covered the weaponry of the army, then engaged in the battle on the left wing, and finally followed the fugitive French and the Army of the Holy Roman Empire to Erfurt. Subsequently, while Frederick marched his army to Leuthen, Mayr covered the road into the Ore Mountains and destroyed all the imperial provisions in Leitmeritz.

== Last campaign and death ==
In the spring of 1758 he made a successful advance, burning the imperial magazine and plundering an armory in Suhl, in which he captured 2200 guns. His expedition to Plauen in the middle of February 1758, the capture of Hof on 12 April, and the capture of Bamberg on 31 May, by fewer than 2000 men, generated fear, despondency and horror. During the summer and autumn 1758, Mayr was entrusted with several particularly dangerous assignments in Saxony. When General Georg Wilhelm von Driesen was commanded to return to Franconia on another occasion, Mayr led his avant-garde, remained in summer and autumn in Saxony, and was often entrusted with special commissions, especially when defending Dresden. In November, he distinguished himself with special bravery in the defense of Dresden against Count Leopold Joseph von Daun and was promoted to Generalmajor. After Daun had lifted his camp before Dresden on 16 November 1758, and had retreated, Mayr followed him as far the Bohemian frontier. At the beginning of December 1758, he moved his corps into the winter quarters at Plauen. He died on 5 January 1759 in Plauen of a pneumonia and, although a Catholic and Jesuit-educated, was buried with military honors in front of the altar of the cemetery church of Plauen.

The later general inspector of the American continental army Friedrich Wilhelm von Steuben served as his adjutant of Mayr, Prussian Generalfeldmarschall Wilhelm René de l’Homme de Courbière was a young captain in the Freibataillon.

Among the many eulogies written for him, this one written by the bibliophile Praetorius (a pen name) strikingly frames the fear he struck into the towns he raided:

Here, Wanderer, lies the horror of his times, Johann von Mayr, a freeman of mercenaries.

He died a hero in battle and fight;
His steady shot and blow never failed;
Fear and quiet human beings fled him.
Here, death became his first conqueror;
He died too late and too early;

Now go and proclaim: We are all sinners.

== Family ==
Mayr left a son, who remained in Austrian service, a daughter, and one of his mistresses as heirs, He was described as a well-built man with a dimpled chin, small eyes, and a prosthetic foot. In his last years, he had become quite chubby, which annoyed him, so he undertook physical exercises and constantly smoked the worst tobacco. During his lifetime he never learned who had been his father. This and his stepfather's profession, bad examples and natural superficiality led him to missteps in his youth.
