= Monetae cudendae ratio =

1526 paper on coinage by Copernicus

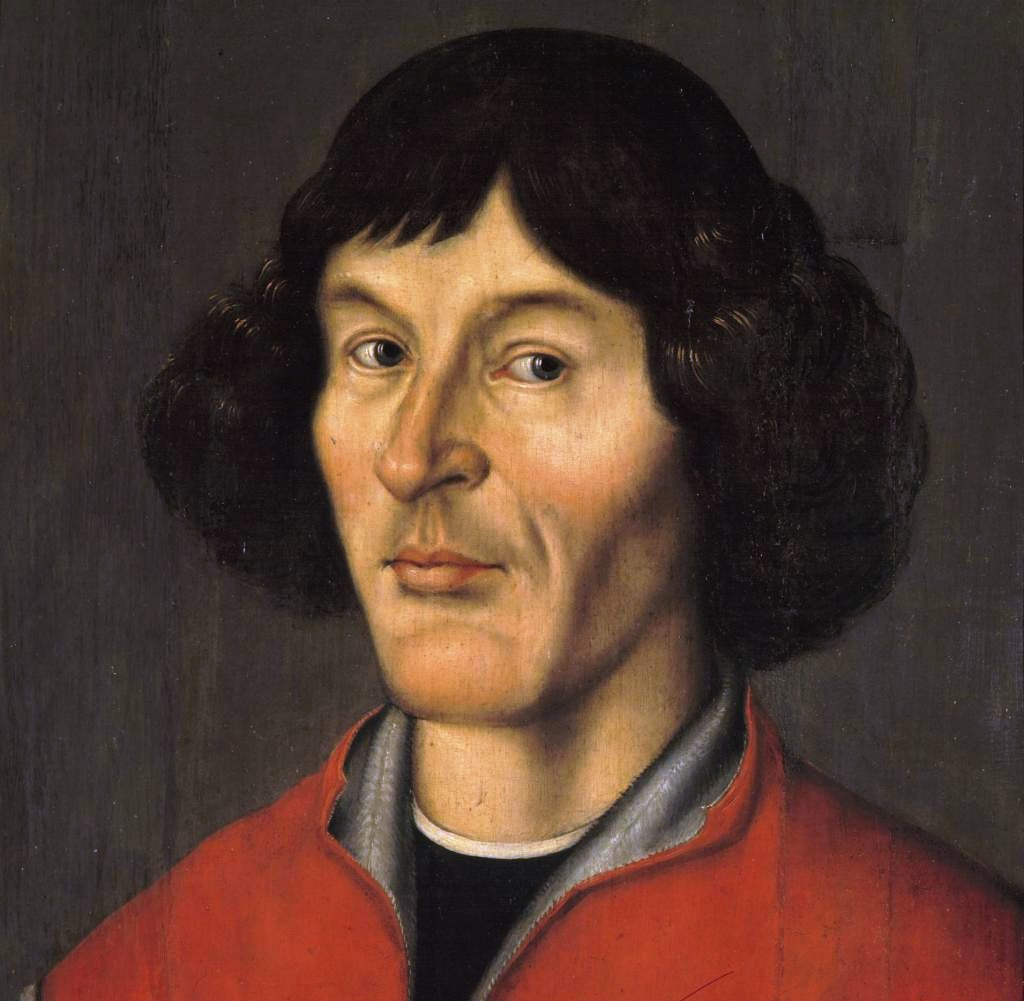
Nicolaus Copernicus

"Monetae cudendae ratio" (also spelled "Monetæ cudendæ ratio"; English: "On the Minting of Coin" or "On the Striking of Coin"; sometimes, "Treatise on Money") is a paper on coinage by Nicolaus Copernicus (Polish: Mikołaj Kopernik). It was written in 1526 at the request of Sigismund I the Old, King of Poland, and presented to the Prussian Diet.

== History ==
Click on image to read the German version.

Copernicus' earliest draft of his essay in 1517 was entitled "De aestimatione monetae" ("On the Value of Coin"). He revised his original notes, while at Olsztyn (Allenstein) in 1519 (which he defended against the Teutonic Knights), as "Tractatus de monetis" ("Treatise on Coin") and "Modus cudendi monetam" ("The Way to Strike Coin"). He made these the basis of a report which he presented to the Prussian Diet at Grudziądz (Graudenz) in 1522; Copernicus' friend Tiedemann Giese accompanied him on the trip to Graudenz. For the 1528 Prussian Diet, Copernicus wrote an expanded version of this paper, "Monetae cudendae ratio", setting forth a general theory of money.

In the paper, Copernicus postulated the principle that "bad money drives out good", which later came to be referred to as Gresham's law after a later describer, Sir Thomas Gresham. This phenomenon had been noted earlier by Nicole Oresme, but Copernicus rediscovered it independently. Gresham's law is still known in Poland and Central and Eastern Europe as the Copernicus-Gresham Law.

In the same work, Copernicus also formulated an early version of the quantity theory of money, or the relation between a stock of money, its velocity, its price level, and the output of an economy. Like many later classical economists of the 18th and 19th centuries, he focused on the connection between increased money supply and inflation.

"Monetae cudendae ratio" also draws a distinction between the use value and exchange value of commodities, anticipating by some 250 years the use of these concepts by Adam Smith—although it, too, had antecedents in earlier writers, including Aristotle.

Copernicus' essay was republished in 1816 in the Polish capital, Warsaw, as Dissertatio de optima monetae cudendae ratione (Dissertation on the Optimal Minting of Coin), few copies of which survive.

== See also ==
- List of multiple discoveries: Fourteenth century
