= Grudziądz =

City in Kuyavian-Pomeranian Voivodeship, Poland

- City county
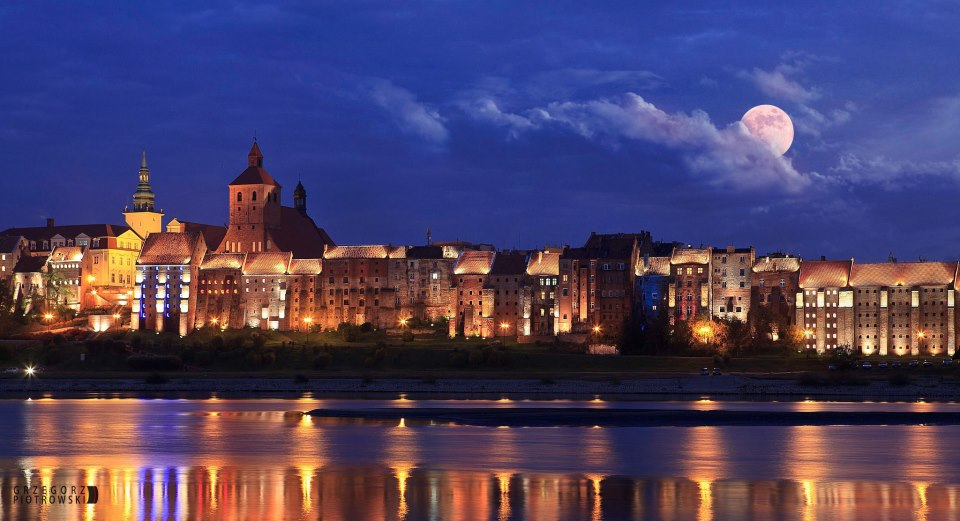
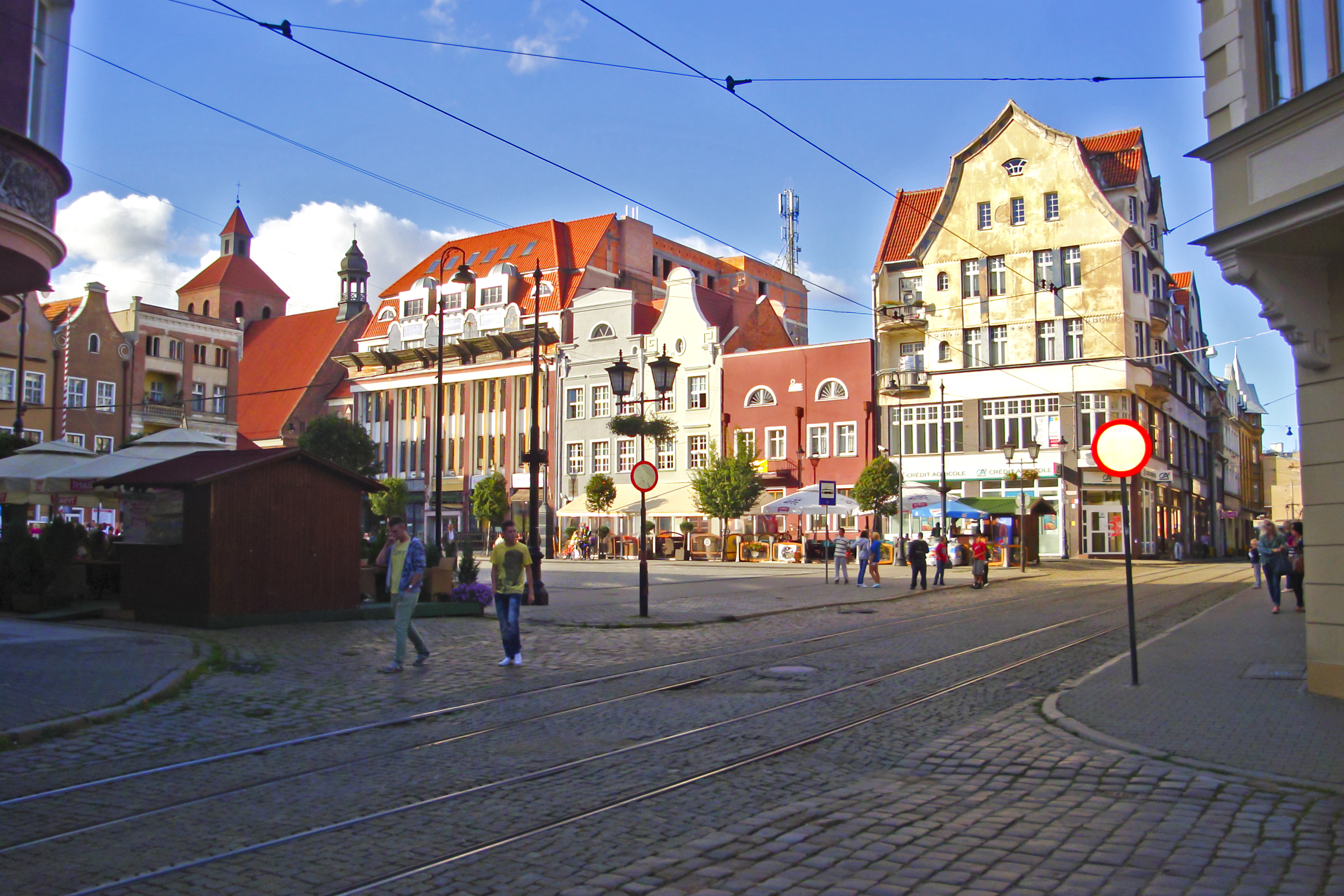
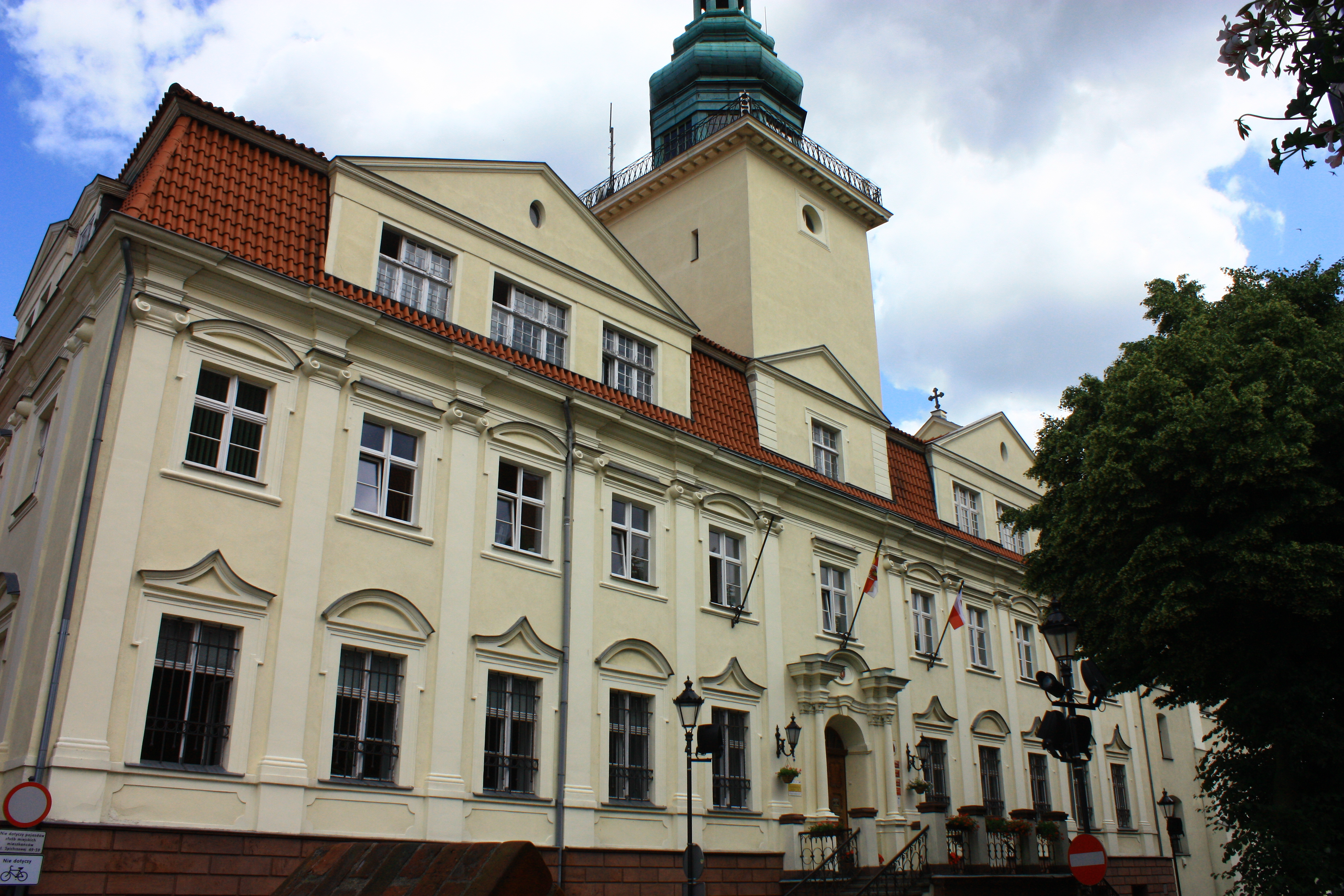
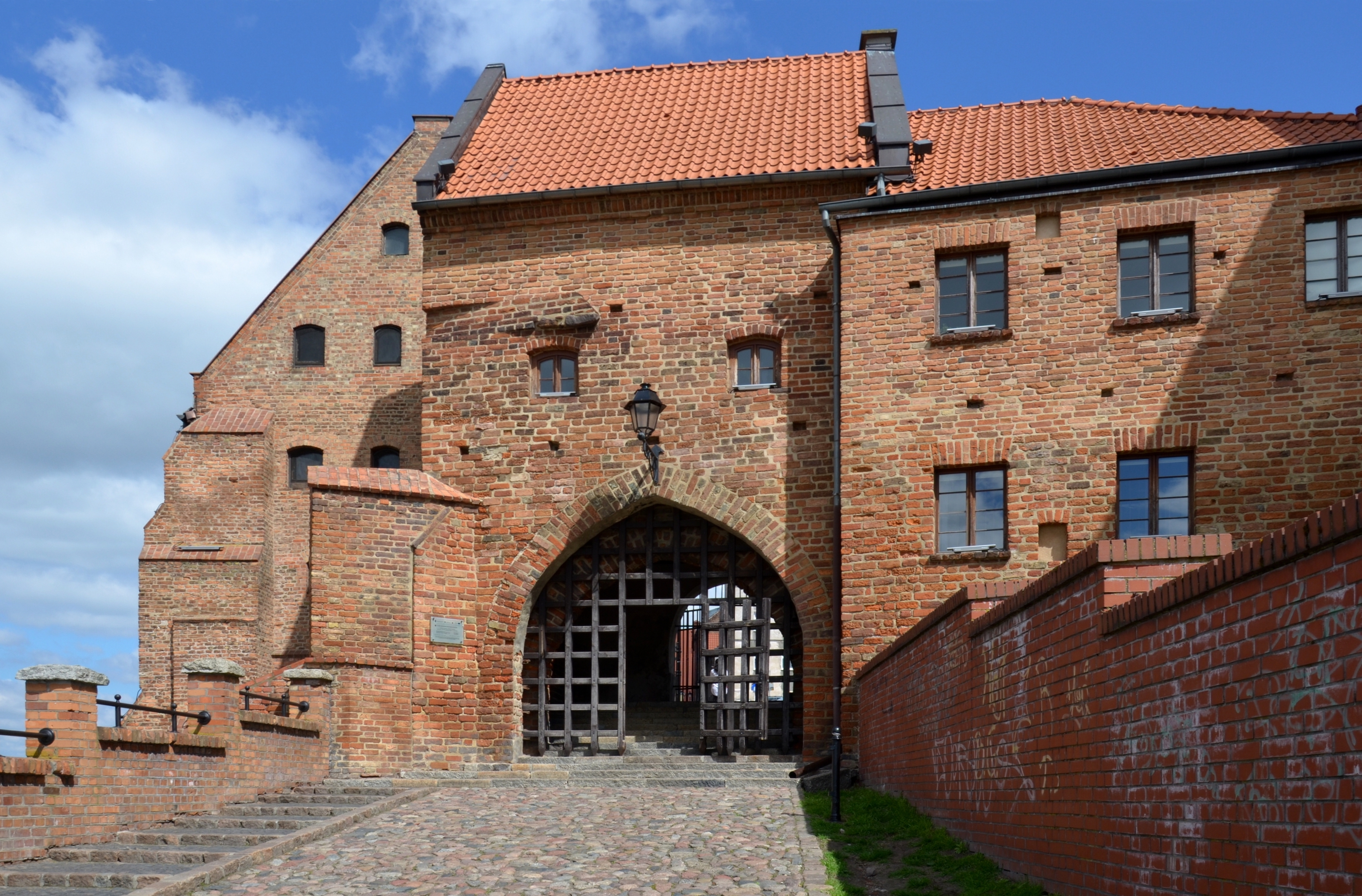
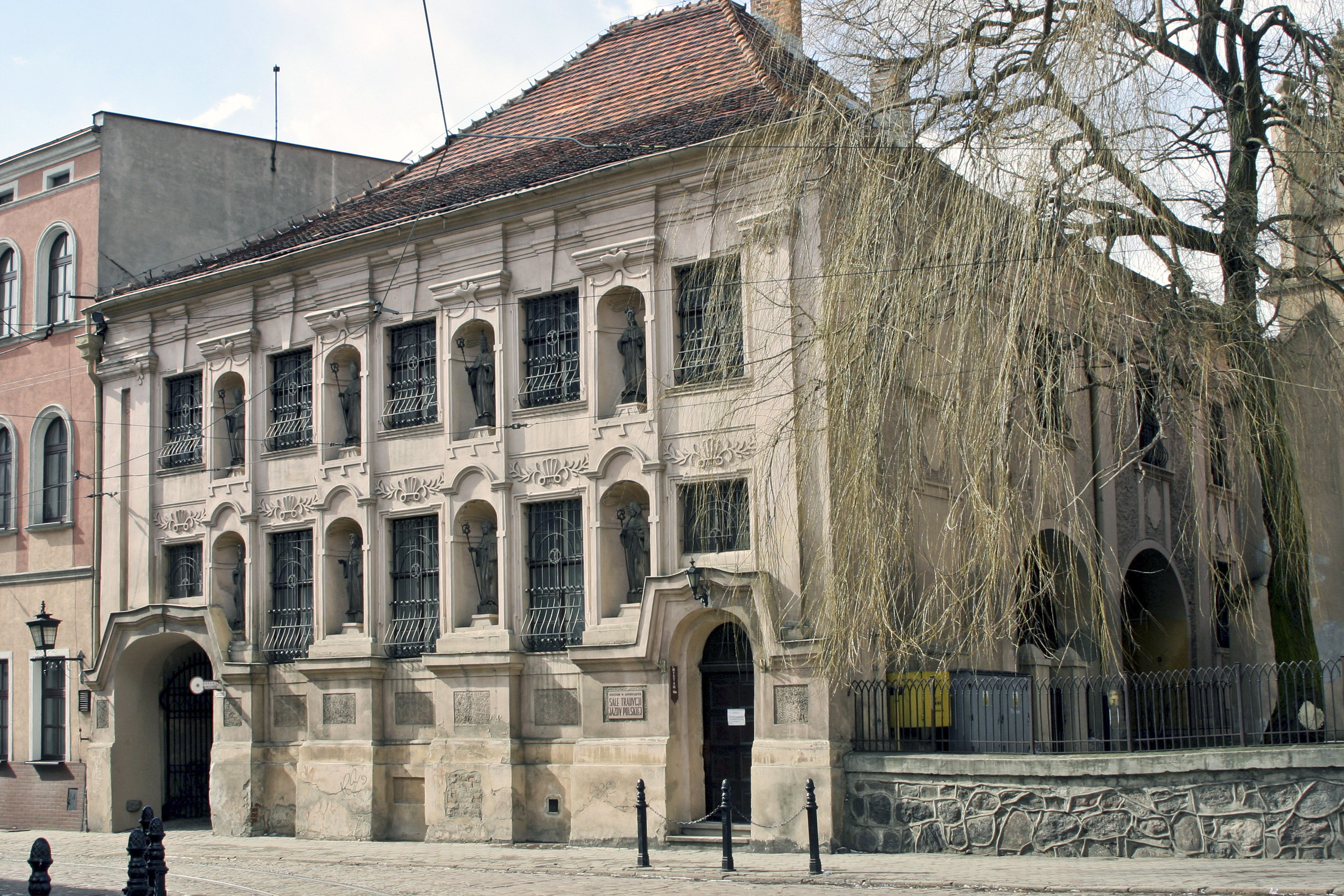
- City panorama and the Grudziądz Granaries Market Square Town Hall Water Gate Former Benedictine monastery

- Flag Coat of arms
- Nickname: City of Uhlans
- Motto(s): Grudziądz – Miasto Otwarte (Grudziądz – Open city)
- Location within Poland
- Coordinates: 53°29′15″N 18°45′18″E
- Country: Poland
- Voivodeship: Kuyavian-Pomeranian
- County: city county
- First mentioned: 11 April 1065
- Town rights: 18 June 1291

Government
  - Mayor: Maciej Glamowski

Area
  - Total: 57.76 km^{2} (22.30 sq mi)
- Elevation: 50 m (160 ft)

Population (31 December 2021)
  - Total: 92,552 ▼ (40th)
  - Density: 1,602/km^{2} (4,150/sq mi)
- Time zone: UTC+1 (CET)
  - Summer (DST): UTC+2 (CEST)
- Postal code: 86–300 to 86–311
- Area code: +48 056
- Car plates: CG
- Website: http://www.grudziadz.pl

Grudziądz ([ˈɡrud͡ʑɔnt͡s]; German: Graudenz) is a city in northern Poland, with 92,552 inhabitants (2021). Located on the Vistula River, it lies within the Kuyavian-Pomeranian Voivodeship and is the fourth-largest city in its province.

Grudziądz is one of the oldest cities in north-central Poland, founded by King Bolesław I the Brave over 1000 years ago. The well-preserved Old Town has various Gothic and Baroque landmarks, several included on the European Route of Brick Gothic, most notably the unique Grudziądz Granaries, declared a Historic Monument of Poland. Grudziądz is a former royal city of Poland, and became known as the "City of Uhlans" being the location of the former Polish Cavalry Training Centre. Situated at the crossroads of important highways, it is a city of industry and services, and a noted centre for water sports and motorcycle speedway racing.

== Geographical location ==
Grudziądz is located close to the east shore of the river Vistula. It is located in Chełmno Land.

== History ==
=== Early medieval Poland ===
Grudziądz was founded by the Duke of Poland, Bolesław I the Brave of the Piast dynasty.

Initially Grudziądz was a defensive stronghold, known as a gord. The fortress and tower were built to protect the Poles from attacks by the Baltic Prussians.

=== Monastic State of the Teutonic Knights ===
The settlement was re-fortified again from 1234 by the Teutonic Order. The erection of the castle, with the help of stone as building material, was begun around the middle of the 13th century. Under the protection of the castle the settlement gradually began to develop into a town.

In 1277 both "the castle and the town" were besieged heavily by the Yotvingians. The settlement adopted Kulm law in 1291 while under the rule of the monastic state of the Teutonic Knights.

The oldest building parts of the Catholic St. Nicholas' Church stem from the end of the 13th century. The Holy Spirit Church, which apparently was founded during the 13th century, is mentioned together with the town's hospital for the first time in 1345. Other documents reveal that in the 14th century the town already had a well-developed infrastructure. A document of 1380, as an example, refers to the construction of an aqueduct, a fountain and a town-hall cellar.

In the 14th century, papal verdicts ordered the restoration of the town and region to Poland, however, the Teutonic Knights did not comply and continued to occupy it. During the era of the Teutonic Knights, Graudenz had become a distinguished trade center in particular for textiles and agricultural products including grain. In 1411, Nicholas von Renys, leader of the Lizard Union, which sought to reintegrate the city and region with Poland, was unlawfully and without defense beheaded by the Teutonic Knights at the Market Square. Around 1454, Graudenz had already reached about the same level of economic development as other towns in the western part of the State of the Teutonic Order, such as Danzig (Gdańsk), Elbing (Elbląg), Thorn (Toruń), Marienburg (Malbork), Kulm (Chełmno), Konitz (Chojnice), Neumark (Nowe Miasto Lubawskie) and Preußisch Stargard (Starogard Gdański).

=== Kingdom of Poland ===
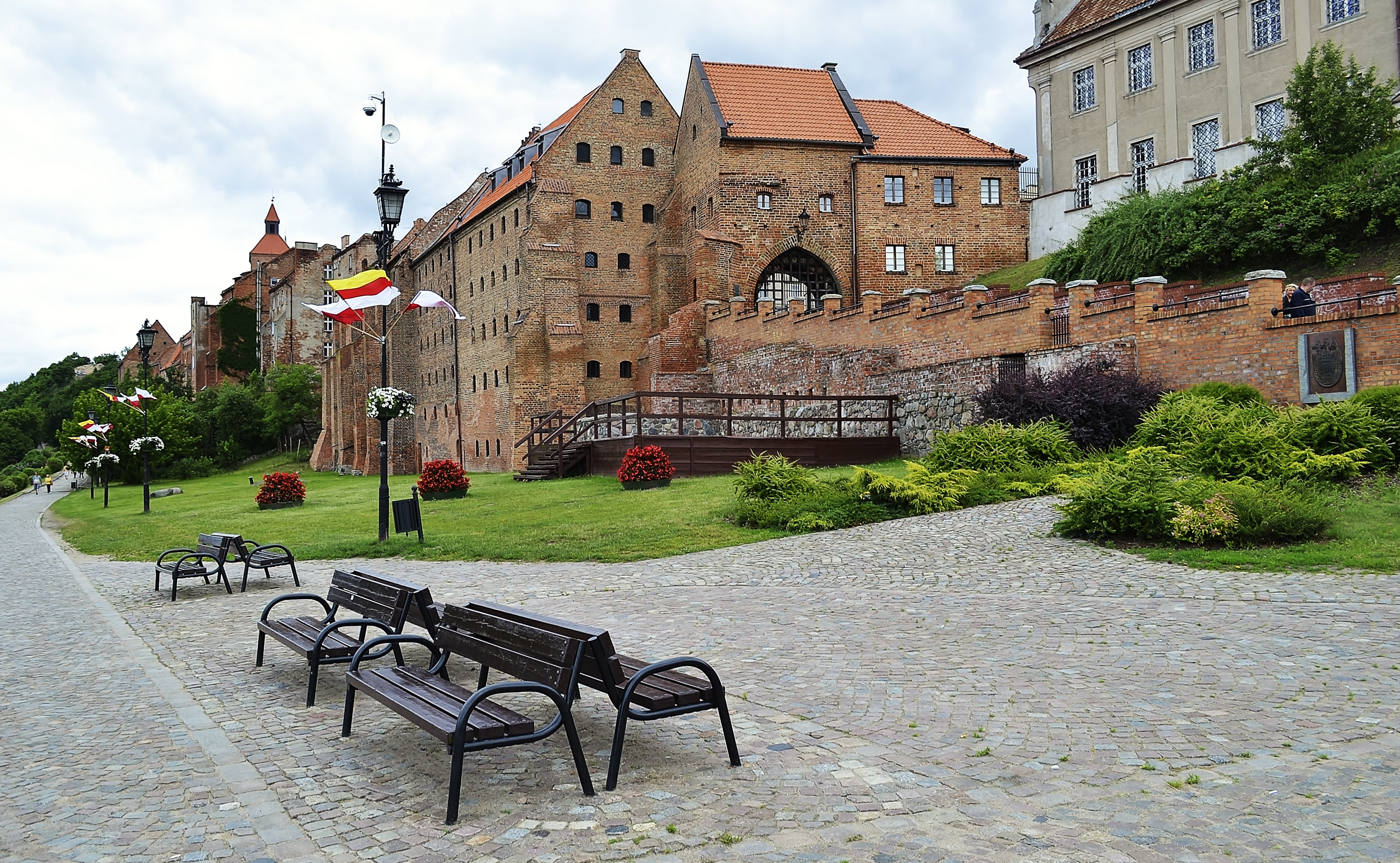
The Water Gate and the city walls of Grudziądz, 14th/15th century

In 1440, the city co-founded the Prussian Confederation which opposed the Monastic State of the Teutonic Knights. At the beginning of the Thirteen Years' War (1454–66), the citizens forced the Teutonic Order to hand over the castle. The confederation asked the King of Poland, Casimir IV Jagiellon to join Poland. The King agreed and signed the act of incorporation in Kraków in March 1454. During the entirety of the war, both the city and the castle remained under Polish control. The 1466 peace treaty confirmed the re-incorporation of Grudziądz to Poland.

Between 1454 and 1772 the city was part of the Polish Chełmno Voivodeship, which itself was since 1466 part of the Polish province of Royal Prussia, soon included in the larger Greater Poland Province. The Grudziądz Castle was seat of the local starostas (royal administrative officials). It was often visited by Polish kings.

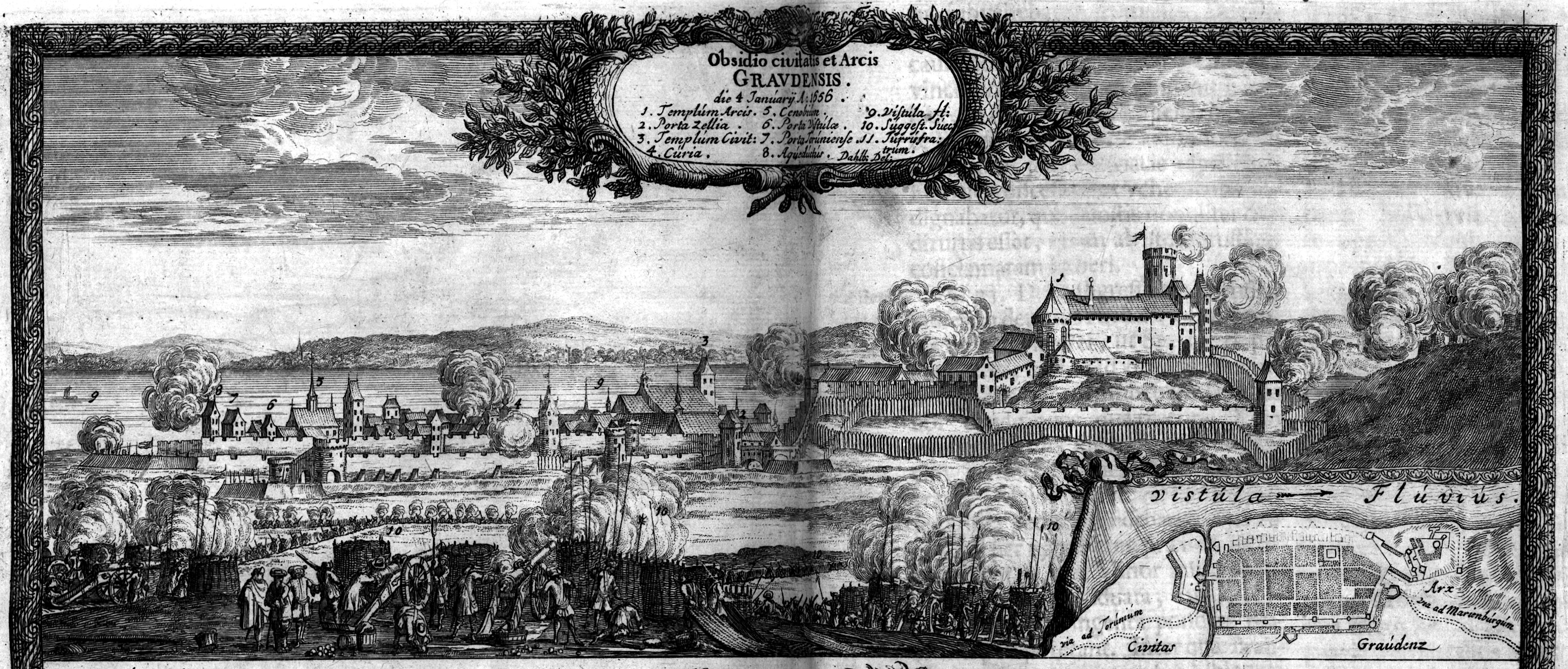
Siege of Grudziądz by the Swedes in 1655

After the great depression of the Thirteen Years' War, new economical growth in the town was slow before the middle of the 16th century. Economic progress was hampered by the religious struggles and by the Polish–Swedish wars throughout the 17th century. At the end of 1655, during the Swedish Deluge, the city and its castle were captured by the Swedes and occupied for four years. In 1659, the Swedes had been besieged for several days and retreated. During their departure, part of the town was destroyed by fire.

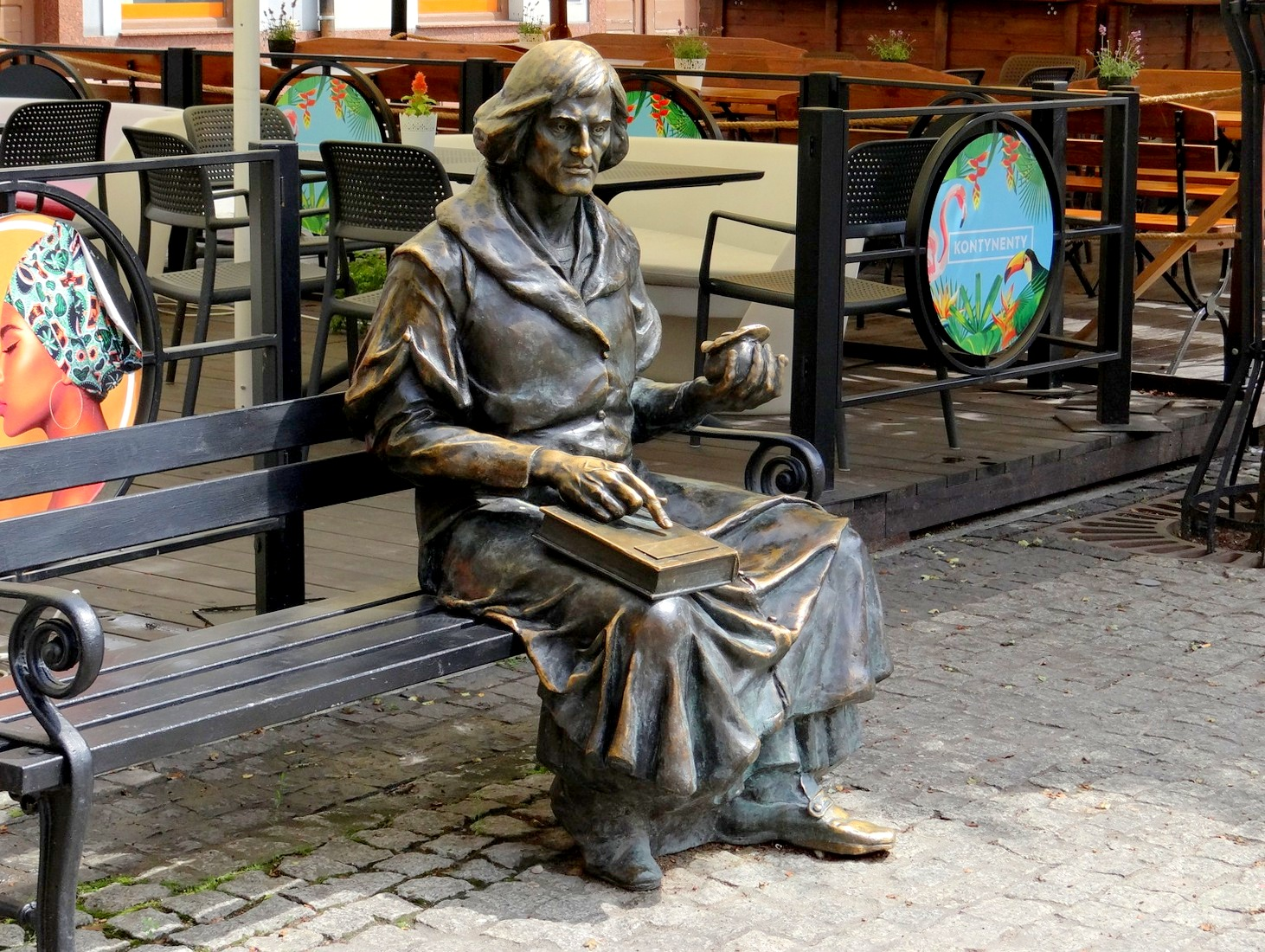
Nicolaus Copernicus Bench, a monument commemorating Copernicus' stay and the presentation of his Monetae cudendae ratio treaty in 1522

In 1522, Nicolaus Copernicus, who aside from his astronomical work was also an economist, presented his treatise Monetae cudendae ratio in Grudziądz. In it he postulated the principle that "bad money drives out good" which became known as the Gresham's law or the Gresham–Copernicus law. This work included an early version of the quantity theory of money – a key concept in economics.

Following Protestant Reformation, in 1569 the local Protestants were given access to the Holy Spirit Church; in 1572 Catholicism seemed to have vanished almost entirely in the town. In 1597 King Sigismund III Vasa gave order that the Protestants had to return all churches taken over by them in the past to the Catholics, including all accessories. The Protestants remained in possession solely of St. George's Church until in 1618 when the base of the building was washed away by the Vistula River and the church was torn down. For a while, they used once more the vacant Holy Spoirit Church, until in 1624 this building together with the hospital had to be handed over to nuns of the Order of Saint Benedict for the purpose of founding an affiliated institution.

Since 1622 Jesuits from Toruń had a station in Grudziądz, which in 1640 was already so strong that it was able to form a residence in Grudziądz, despite objections from the side of the magistrate of the town. In 1648 construction work for building a Jesuit church was taken up. The Jesuits also founded the Jesuit College, which was the first high school in Grudziądz.

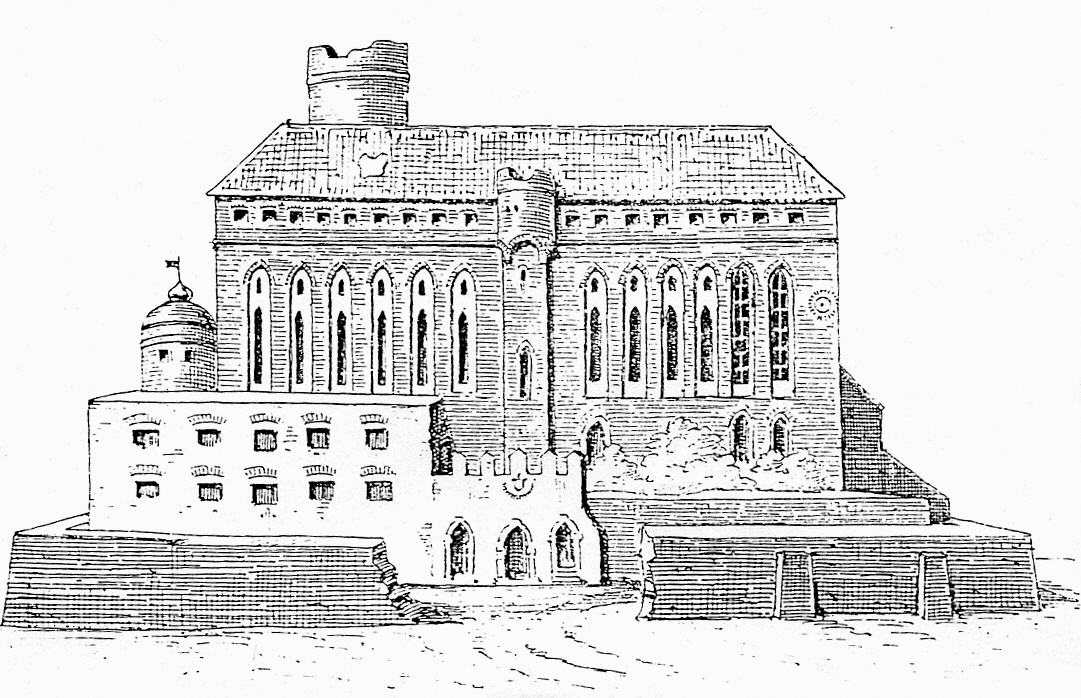
Grudziądz Castle in the 18th century

The town proper was surrounded by town walls, except on the side of river Vistula, where instead of walls there stood huge massive grain silos, from where grain could be transported through wooden pipes to the embankment of the river.

=== Prussian Partition of Poland ===
Following the First Partition of Poland declared on 5 August 1772, the city was annexed by the Kingdom of Prussia. In 1773, it had a population of only 2,172 persons. In the late 18th and early 19th centuries, it was part of the area affected by the Partitions of Poland. To stimulate municipal trade, Frederick the Great brought in 44 colonist families. Grain trade flourished. Among the most successful grain traders were the Schönborn family. In 1776, a decision was made to build a fortress in the town. Between 1796 and 1804, by decision of the King of Prussia, the Grudziądz Castle was demolished. During the Napoleonic invasion in Prussia in 1806–1807, the fortress was successfully defended by General of Infantry Wilhelm René de l'Homme de Courbière against attacks by French troops.

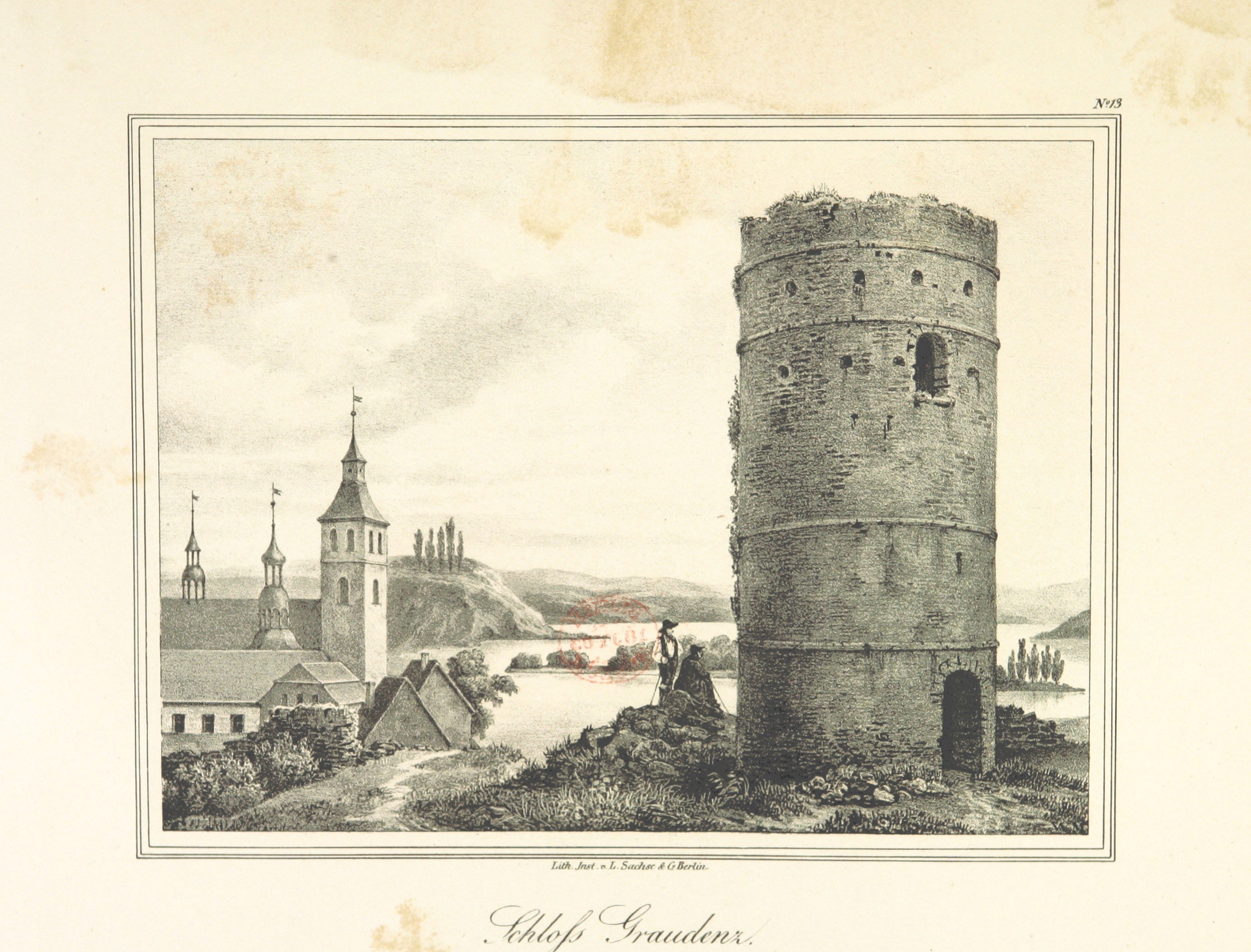
19th century view of the Klimek Tower, the last remaining part of the Grudziądz Castle, after its destruction by the Prussian authorities

In 1871, Graudenz became part of the unified German Empire. Administratively it belonged to the administrative district of Regierungsbezirk Marienwerder in the Province of West Prussia. With the improvement of the railway network in Germany, Graudenz transiently lost its meaning as an important trading place for grain. In 1878, the railway line to Jabłonowo Pomorskie (then Germanized as Goßlershausen) opened. After the construction of a railroad bridge across the Vistula in 1878, a railway line to Laskowice (Laskowitz) opened. Graudenz became a rapidly growing industrialized city. In 1883 also the Thorn (Toruń)-Graudenz-Marienburg (Malbork) railway line went into operation.

In 1899, the Chamber of Commerce was established in Graudenz. The Imperial German Navy named a light cruiser class and its lead ship, the SMS Graudenz, after the city. The newspaper Der Gesellige, founded by book seller Rothe in 1826, belonged up to the end of World War I to the most widely spread newspapers of east Germany. Around the turn to the 20th century, Graudenz had become an important cultural centre in east Germany with numerous schools, municipal archives and a museum.

The city was the site of a military prison for Polish activists. In 1832, also 249 Polish insurgents the November Uprising were imprisoned by the Prussians in the local fortress and subjected to forced labour, malnutrition, beatings and insults. Released prisoners who left Europe formed the Gromada Grudziądz in Portsmouth, England in 1835 as part of the Great Emigration movement.

==== Germanisation of the Poles in the Prussian Partition ====
Frederick had nourished a particular contempt for the Polish state and people. Germanisation was enforced to assimilate residents. He brought in German and Frisian workers and peasants, who in his opinion, were more suitable for building up his new civilization. Frederick settled around 300,000 colonists in the eastern provinces of Prussia. Using state funds for colonization, German craftsmen were placed in all local Polish cities. A second colonization wave of ethnic Germans was pursued by Prussia after 1832. Laws were passed aimed at Germanisation of the Polish inhabited areas and 154,000 colonists were settled by the Prussian Settlement Commission before World War I. Professor Martin Kitchen writes that in areas where the Polish population lived alongside Germans a virtual apartheid existed, with bans on the Polish language and religious discrimination, besides attempts to colonize the areas with Germans.

Approximately 16,850 Poles and about 26,000 Germans lived in the district of Graudenz. To resist Germanisation, Polish activists started to publish the newspaper "Gazeta Grudziądzka" in 1894. It advocated the social and economic emancipation of rural society and opposed Germanization – publishing articles critical of Germany. German attempts to repress its editor Wiktor Kulerski only helped to increase its circulation. From 1898 to 1901, a secret society of Polish students seeking to restore Polish independence operated in the city, but the activists were tried by German courts in 1901, frustrating their efforts.

In Graudenz, German soldiers were stationed in the local fortress as part of the Germanization measures, and the authorities placed soldiers with the most chauvinistic attitude towards the Poles there. The German government brought in more stationed military, merchants and state officials to influence population figures. In the 1910 census 84% of the population of the town and 58% of the county was recorded as German.

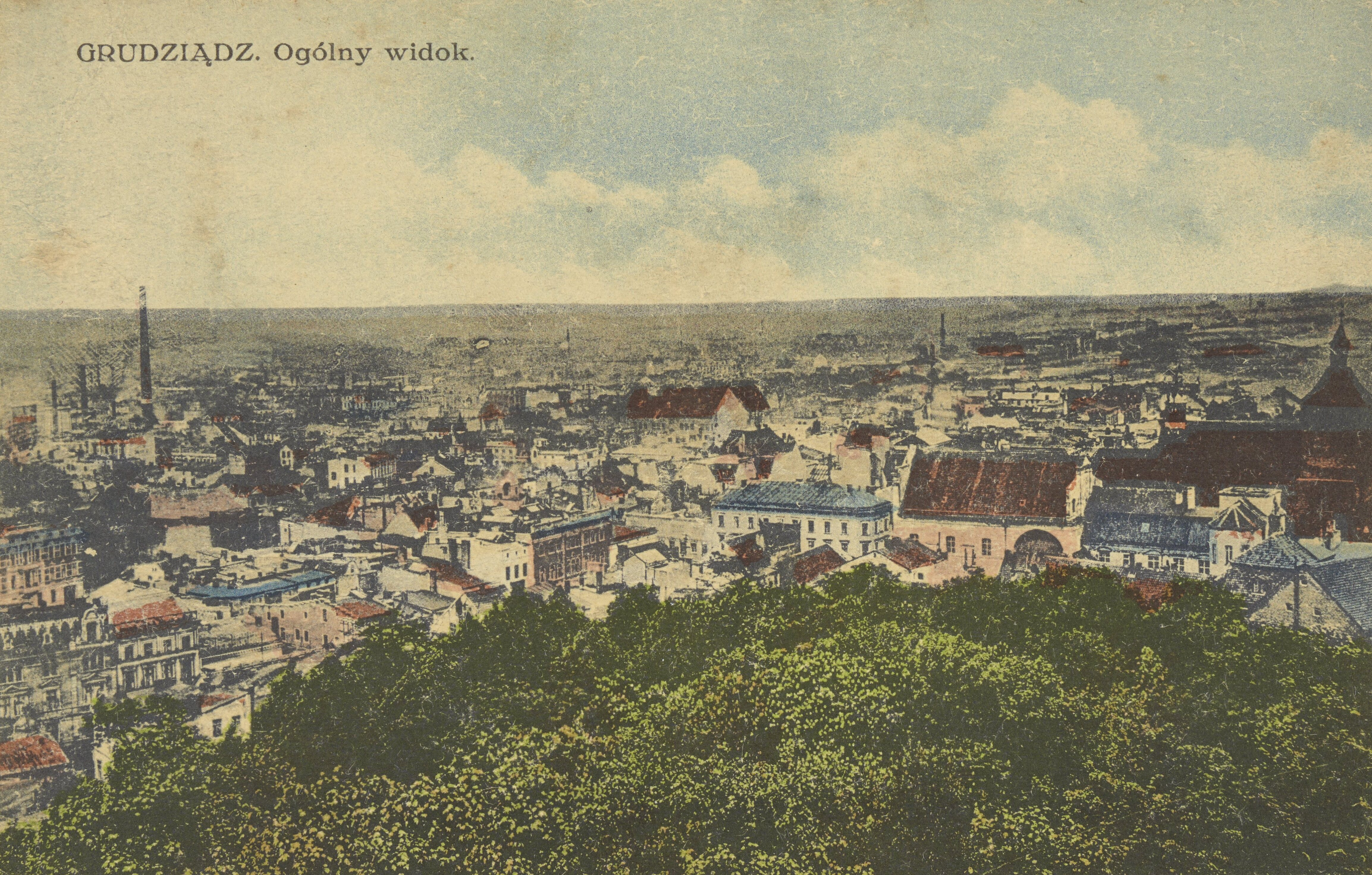
View of the city between 1914 and 1918

Census figures published by the German Empire have been criticised as unreliable. Historians believe they have a high degree of falsification; formal pressure on census takers (predominantly school-teachers) was possible, and a new bilingual category was created to further complicate the results, as bilingual people (that is those who could speak both German and Polish) were classified as Germans. Some analysts have asserted that all people registering as bilingual were classified as Germans. The Polish population in this heavily Germanised city has been officially estimated at around 12–15% during this period.

The Polish population numbers rose steadily before the First World War. In the German election of 1912, the National Liberal Party of Germany received 53% of all votes, whilst Polish candidates won 23% of votes. In 1912, Wiktor Kulerski founded the Polish Catholic Peasant Party in the city, which aimed at protecting the local Polish population

In 1913, the Polish Gazeta Grudziądzka reached a circulation of 128,000, making it the third largest Polish newspaper in the world.

=== Interwar Poland ===
On 23 January 1920, the regulations of the Treaty of Versailles became effective, the city was reincorporated under its Polish name Grudziądz into the reborn Polish state (Second Polish Republic), although a majority of its inhabitants were German. At that time Józef Włodek, the newly appointed Polish mayor, described his impression of the town as "modern but unfortunately completely German".

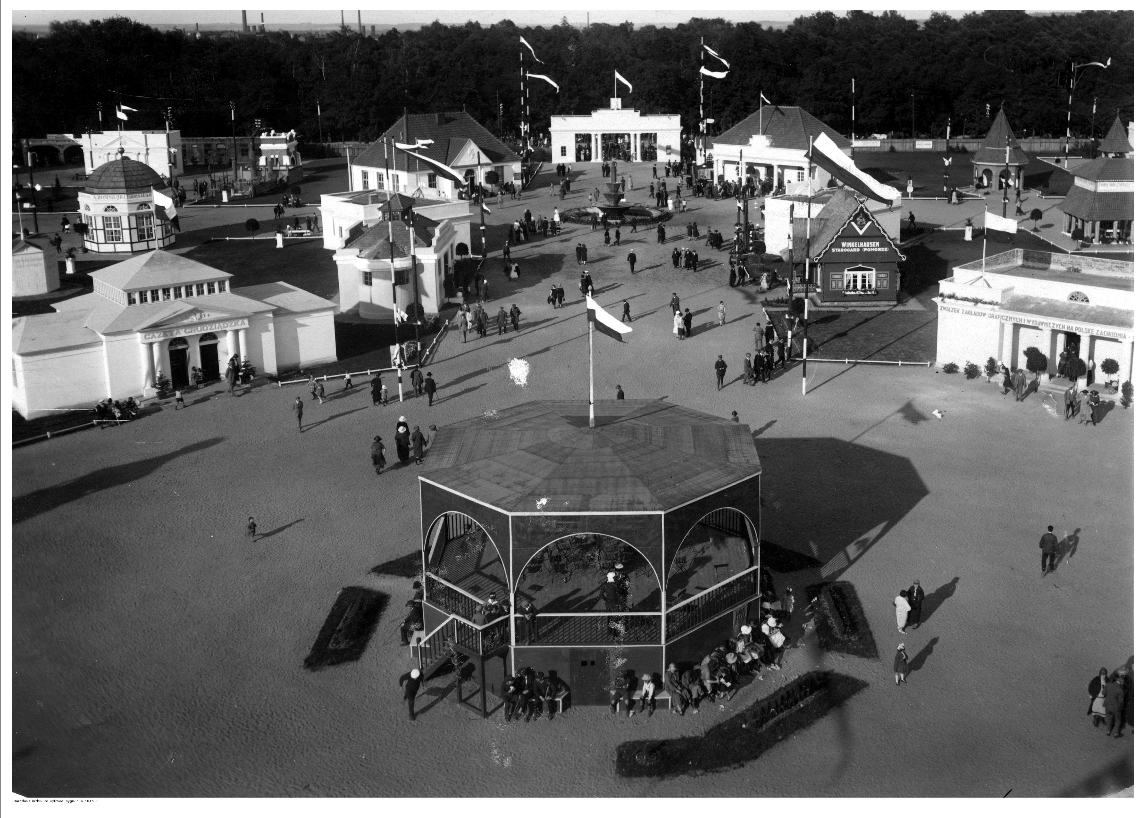
First Pomeranian Agricultural and Industrial Exhibition, 1925

Between 1926 and 1934 the number of Germans (34,194 in 1910) rose from 3,542 to 3,875. Some Polish authors emphasize a wider emigration pattern motivated chiefly by economic conditions and the unwillingness of the German minority to live in the Polish state. In 1935, Poles already constituted 93% of the inhabitants of Grudziądz, so within a few years the city became ethnically Polish again after the ethnic Germans left the city.

The German author Christian Raitz von Frentz writes that after the First World War ended, the Polish government tried to reverse the systematic Germanization of the past decades.

Prejudices, stereotypes and conflicts dating back to German harsh rule and discrimination of Poles influenced Polish policies towards minorities in the new independent Polish state.

The Polish authorities, supported by the public (e.g. the "explicitly anti-German" Związek Obrony Kresów Zachodnich), initiated a number of measures to further Polonization. The local press was also hostile towards the Germans.

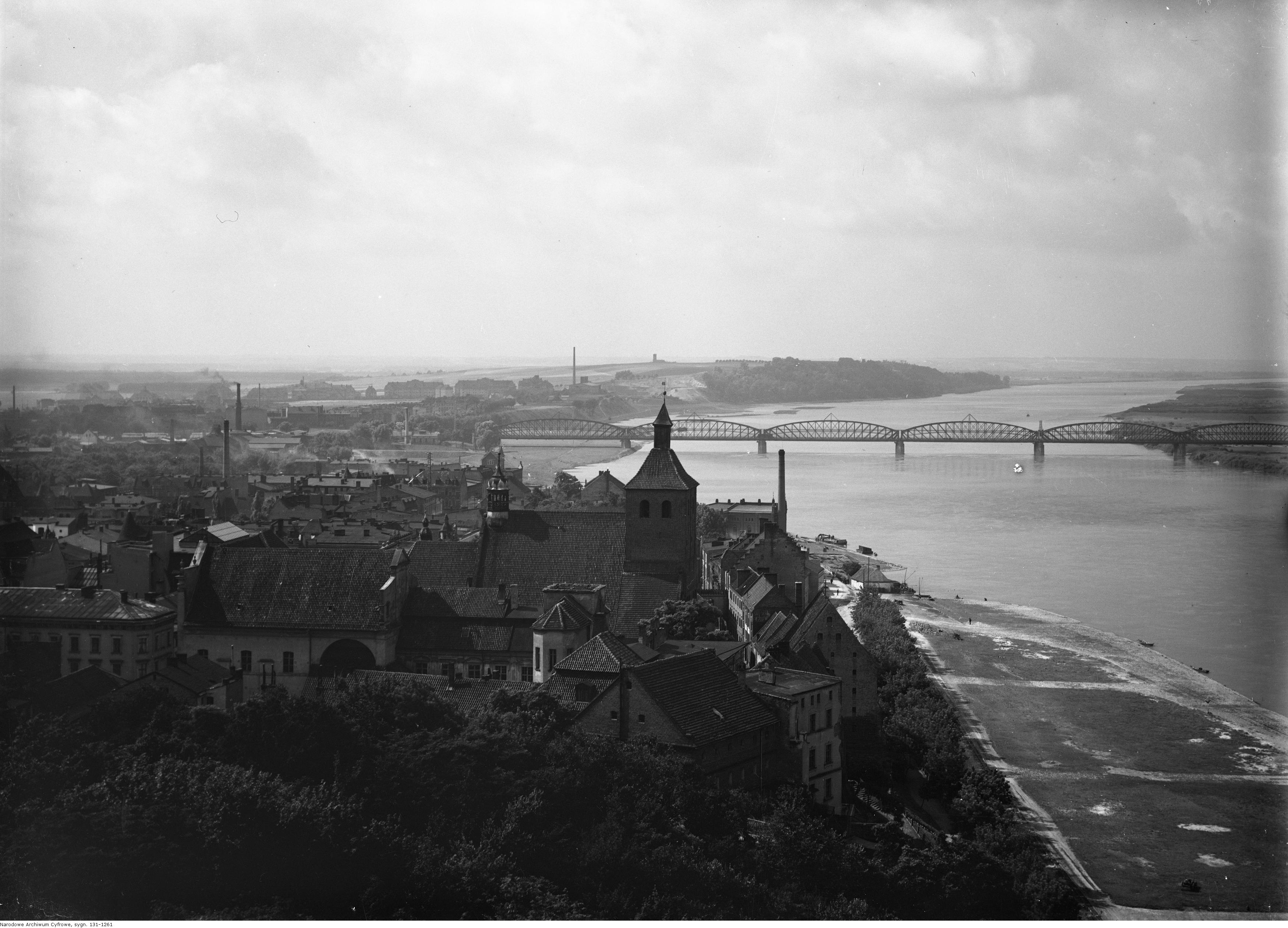
Cityscape of Grudziądz in 1928

Fearful of a re-Germanization of the city, the Polish paper "Słowo Pomorskie" (23.19.1923) criticized the authorities of Grudziądz for tolerating the local German amateur theatre "Deutsche Bühne". The theatre was funded by money from Berlin. Created before the war, its actors were mostly German officers stationed with the local garrison. The mayor responded by pointing out that the theatre was being monitored because of suspected "anti-state activities". According to Kotowski, this episode indicates that even the most minor activities of the German minority were closely scrutinized by the Polish authorities beginning with the earliest phase of Polish policy towards the German minority. The German theatre was re-opened by the Nazis in 1943, while the last director of the Polish theatre in the city in the years 1922–24 was murdered by them.

In the interbellum, Grudziądz served as an important centre of culture and education with one of the biggest Polish military garrisons and several military schools located both in and around the city. A large economic potential and the existence of important institutions like the Pomeranian Tax Office and the Pomeranian Chamber of Industry and Trade, helped Grudziądz become the economic capital of the Pomeranian Voivodeship in the interwar period. Grudziądz's economic potential was featured at the First Pomeranian Exhibition of Agriculture and Industry in 1925, officially opened by Stanisław Wojciechowski, President of the Second Polish Republic.

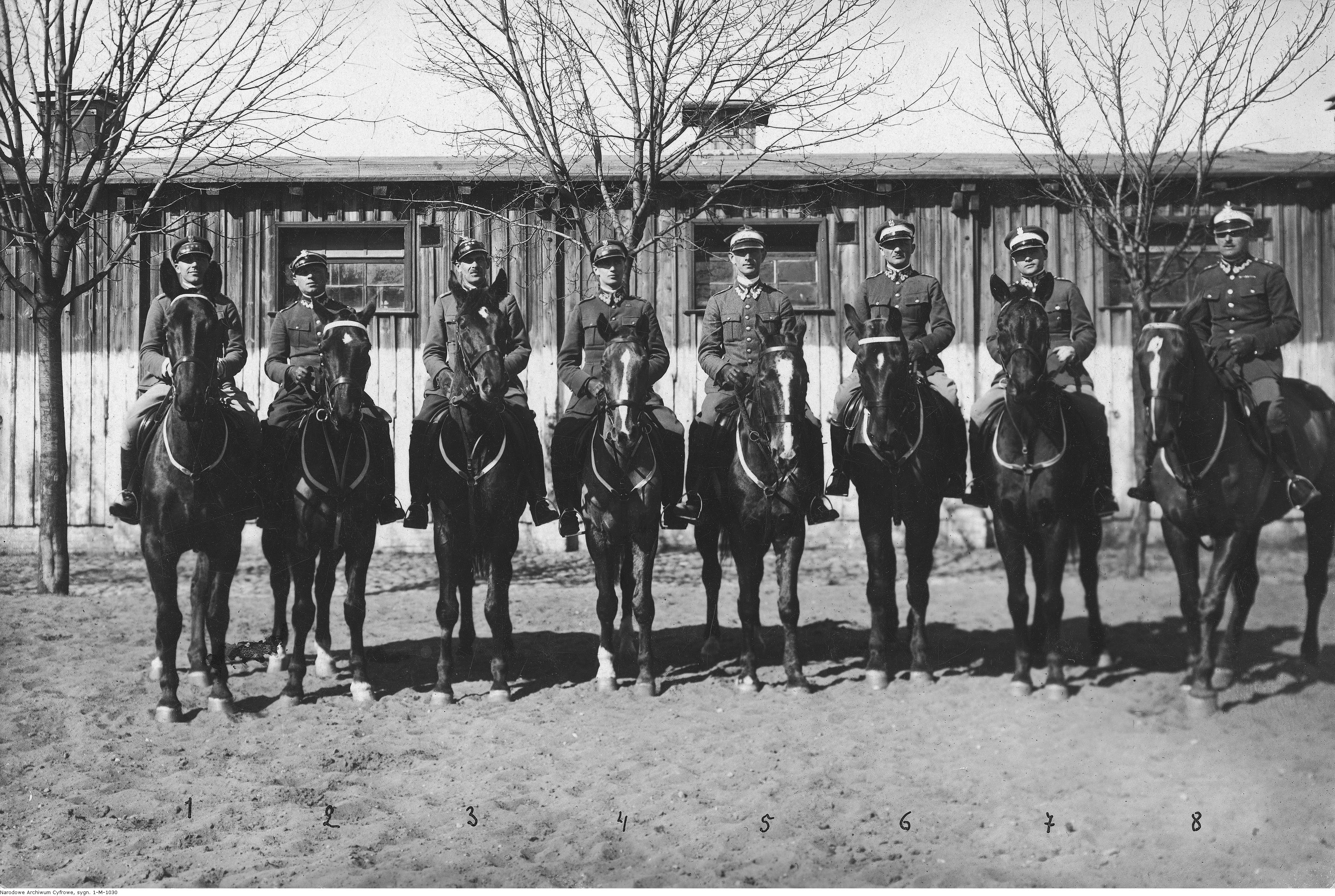
Polish cavalry officers at the Cavalry Training Center in Grudziądz before leaving for an international equestrian competition in Nice, 1926

The 64th and 65th Infantry Regiments and the 16th Light Artillery Regiment of the Polish Army were stationed in Grudziądz during the 19 years of the inter-war period. They were part of the 16th Infantry Division, which had its headquarters in the city, as did the cavalry's famous 18th Pomeranian Uhlan Regiment. The Grudziądz Centre of Cavalry Training educated many notable army commanders, including future Polish resistance hero Witold Pilecki. Military education in Grudziądz was also provided by the Centre of the Gendarmerie, the Air School of Shooting and Bombarding, and the N.C.O. Professional School, which offered courses for infantry reserve officer cadets.

In 1920 a German-language school was founded. In 1931 the Polish government decreed a reduction in the number of German classes in the school and requested lists of Catholic children and those pupils with Polish-sounding names which they viewed as victims of Germanization, from the German school. Although the list was not prepared, some of the children were transferred, which led to a school-strike. The German school followed ideas and customs as those in Germany. It was headed by a Nazi sympathiser Hilgendorf who praised Nazi ideology. The Polish authorities were alarmed when a notebook of one female student was discovered by them, which contained the Nazi party anthem, the Horst Wessel Lied and revisionistic text. The discovery caused outrage and calls to dismiss Hilgendorf due to his irredentist beliefs In November 1933 two German craftsmen were killed by a Polish mob during a local election campaign.

=== World War II ===
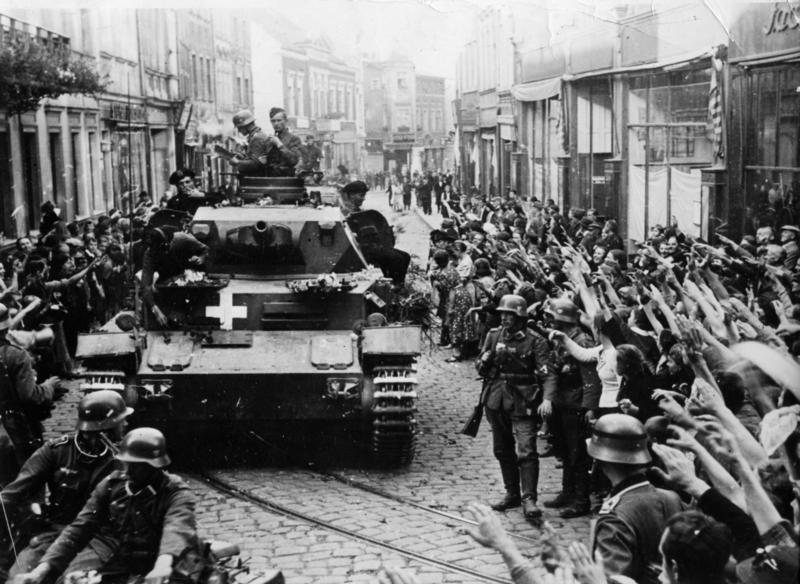
German residents in Grudziądz welcome forces of Nazi Germany in 1939.

On 3 September 1939 units from the Wehrmacht entered the town after the Battle of Grudziądz and then occupied it. From 26 October 1939 to 1945 the city was part of the administrative district of Regierungsbezirk Marienwerder in the new province of Reichsgau Danzig-West Prussia.

==== Nazi atrocities ====
Following the German invasion, the Einsatzkommando 16 and Einsatzgruppen IV and V entered the city to commit crimes against the population. They also carried out mass searches of Polish courthouses, organizations, police stations, etc., and seized large amounts of grain, textiles, coffee, equipment, and even homing pigeons. On 7 September, 25 Polish citizens were detained as hostages – priests, teachers and other members that enjoyed the respect of local society. They were threatened with execution if any harm came to the ethnic Germans from the city who were detained and held by the Polish authorities during the invasion of Poland. After their initial release on the return of the members of the German minority, they were re-arrested and most of them were shot. On 9 September a further 85 Poles were imprisoned by the Germans. The German authorities destroyed the city's monuments to Polish independence, and banned Polish priests from speaking Polish during church masses.

On 4 September, the Einsatzgruppe V demanded a list of names of all members of the 600-strong Jewish community within 14 hours, as well as a list of all their possessions. They were also fined 20,000 zlotych

On 6 September, the whole city was covered with posters demanding that Jews and "mixed races" of category I and IInd degree (so-called Mischlinge, i.e. persons of mixed race) gather at the headquarters of the Einsatzgruppe V (established in the local school). Around 100 people responded to the demand and were immediately arrested and robbed. After this they were transported to an unknown destination and disappeared – it is believed that they were most likely executed by the Germans in the Mniszek-Grupa forests.

On 19 October, the city was visited by the NSDAP Gauleiter (regional chief) Albert Forster. In a public speech to the Volksdeutsche, he declared that the area was to become "one hundred percent" German, and that Poles "have nothing to do here, and should be evicted"

Grudziądz was the location of the German concentration camp Graudenz, a subcamp of Stutthof concentration camp.

===== Selbstschutz participation in mass murder =====
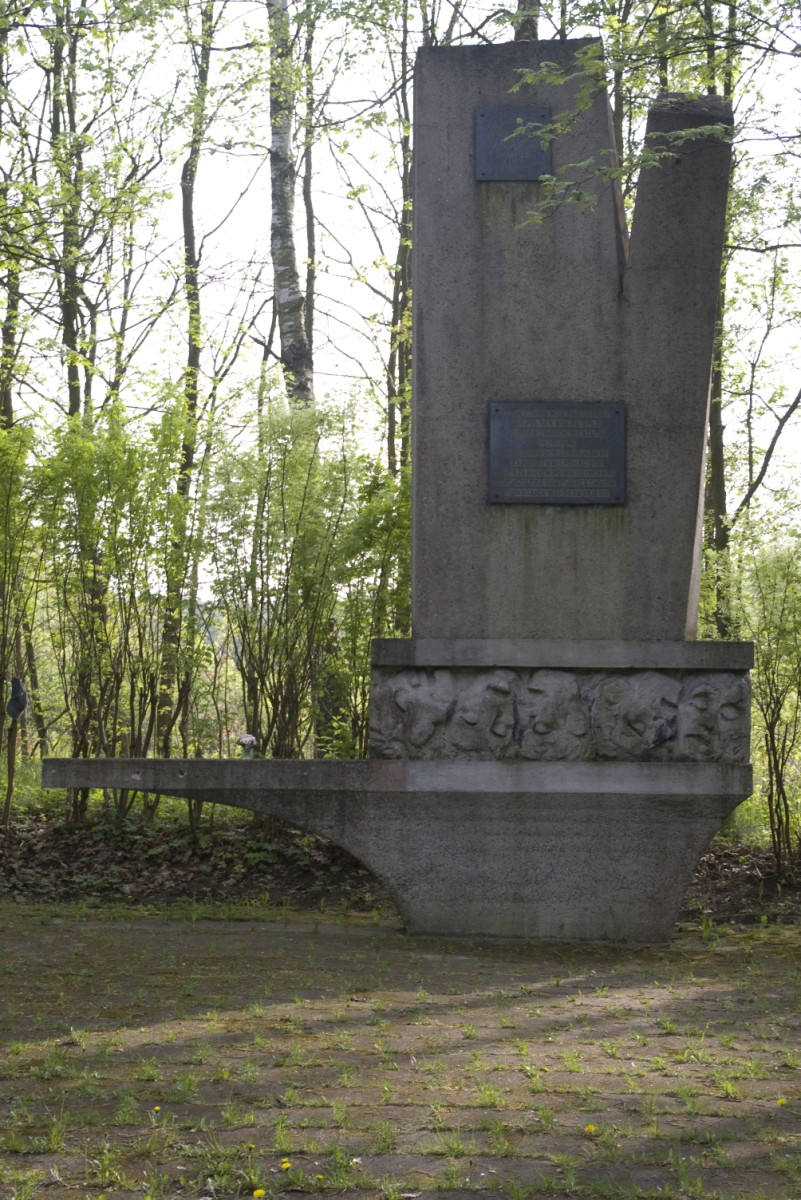
Monument to Poles murdered by the German ethnic organisation Selbstschutz near Książe Góry

Alongside the military and Einsatzgruppen administration, the first structures of Selbstschutz were established – a paramilitary formation of members of the German minority in the region. The head of Selbstschutz in Grudziądz was Doctor Joachim Gramse. In October 1939, Selbstschutz created an internment camp for Poles seeking to restore Polish independence, whose commandant was a local German Kurt Gotze.

Teachers, officials, social workers, doctors, merchants, members of patriotic organisations, lawyers, policemen, farmers and 150 Polish priests were held in this camp. There were also around 200 Polish boys, students of local schools, who were soon deported to forced labour in Germany. It is estimated that around 4,000 to 5,000 people went through the camp. Other arrested Poles were held in the cellars of the Grudziądz Fortress. The local Germans who ran the camp established their own "court" which decided the fate of the prisoners. The "court" comprised: Kurt Gotze, Helmut Domke, Horst Kriedte, Hans Abromeit (owner of a drugstore), Paul Neuman (barber). Based on their decisions, some of the prisoners were sent to concentration camps, 300 were murdered en masse; only a few were released. Those sentenced to death were mostly executed through shooting by the Selbstschutz in Księże Góry near Grudziądz; in October and November 1939 several hundred people were murdered there and their bodies buried in five mass graves. The victims were usually shot at the edges of already dug out graves.

Further executions were carried out in desolate areas of Grudziądz: on 11 November 1939 near Grudziądz Fortress, the Selbstschutz executed ten Polish teachers, four Polish priests and four women. Additionally, 37 people were murdered in Grudziądz city park. On 29 October 1939 a unit of Selbstschutz mass-murdered ten Polish hostages as revenge for posters that had appeared in the city calling for resistance against Nazi occupation.

The commander of the Gendarmerie Training Center, the commander and deputy commander of the Reserve Cavalry Cadet School, the research director and three other instructors of the Cavalry Training Center were murdered by the Russians in the Katyn massacre in 1940.

==== Final months of World War II ====
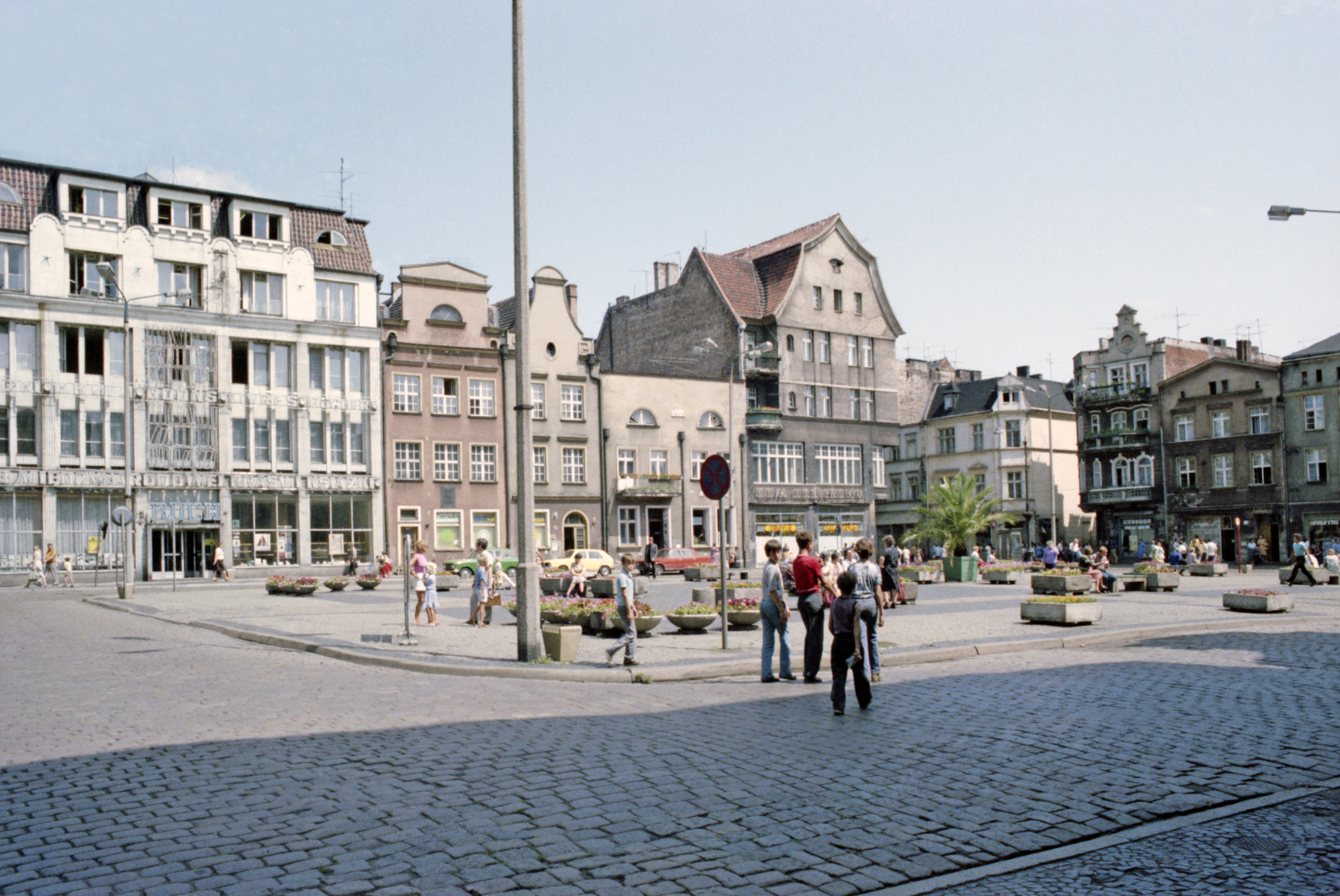
The Market Square in 1983

As the result of heavy fighting in 1945, over 60% of the city was destroyed. Soviet Major Lev Kopelev participated in those battles and covered the final surrender of the German garrison in his book "To Be Preserved Forever". He describes the joint psychological warfare in March 1945 by the Red Army and members of the NKFD. From March 9 to 12, 1945, the Russians removed residents from the city center, then looted it, including the personal property of the residents. In the following months, the Russians looted local factories and enterprises of several hundred tons of finished products, semi-finished goods, raw materials, scrap metal, machinery, tools, etc. In April, the Poles began rebuilding the industry, which had been looted more by the Russians than destroyed in the fighting. The NKVD operated a camp for arrested Poles from Pomerania in the city.

As the war ended, the German population of the city fled or was expelled to Germany in accordance with the Potsdam Agreement. Local Polish survivors were joined by Poles who had emigrated from Polish areas annexed by the Soviet Union east of the Curzon line, where they had been asked by the Soviet authorities to either accept incorporation into the U.S.S.R. or to leave what had been their former homeland.

== Demographics ==
In 2018, it was populated by 95,045 inhabitants.

== Economy ==
Grudziądz has a diversified economy based on manufacturing, agriculture, and services.

The city has seen significant investment in the energy sector, notably with the construction of a large gas-fired power plant by Energa. In 2025, Energa awarded Siemens Energy a contract to build a second combined-cycle gas turbine (CCGT) unit in Grudziądz, with an investment value of approximately 3.1 billion Polish złoty. The additional unit is expected to provide around 560 MW of dispatchable capacity.

== Education ==
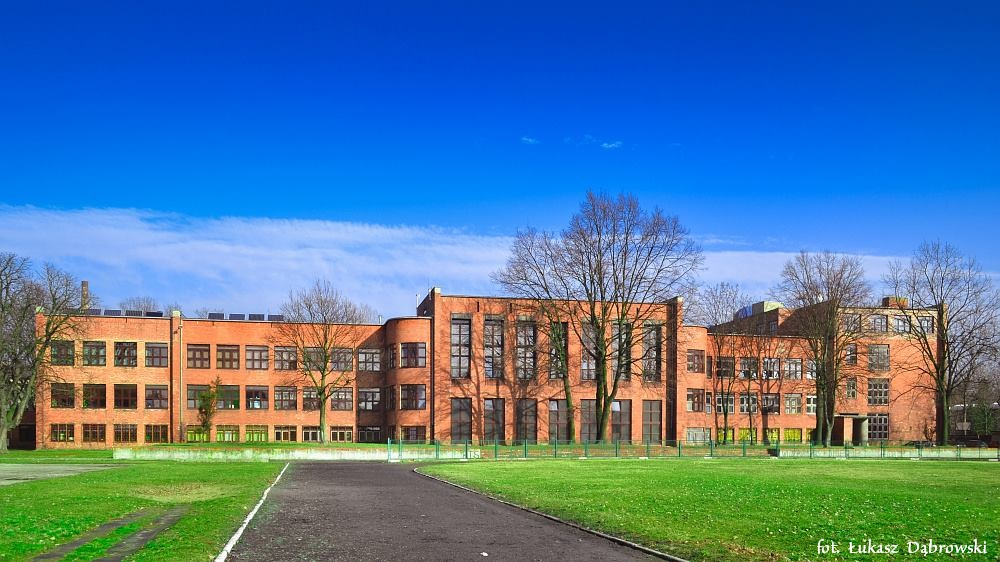
Grudziądz Technical High School and astronomical observatory

- Nicolaus Copernicus University
- Grudziądzka Szkoła Wyższa

== Sport ==
Grudziądz has two professional sports teams. The largest following has the popular speedway team GKM Grudziądz, who race at the Grudziądz Speedway Stadium and compete in the Ekstraliga (Poland's top division), whereas the local football team Olimpia Grudziądz has a slightly more modest following, playing in the lower leagues (as of 2025). GKS Olimpia Grudziądz is also a multi-sports club with athletics and judo sections.

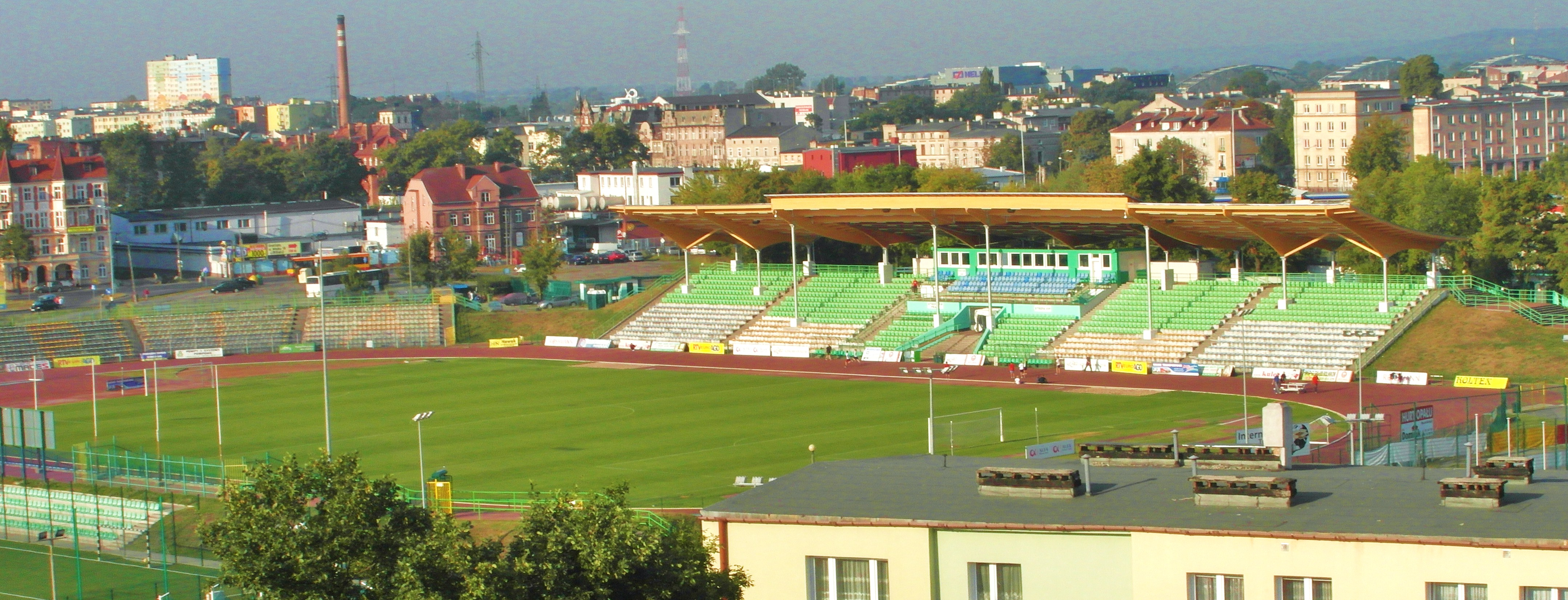
Bronisław Malinowski Central Stadium

One of the key elements of the city’s sports infrastructure is the Bronisław Malinowski Central Stadium, also referred to as the Grudziądz Municipal Stadium. It serves as the home ground of the local football club, Olimpia Grudziądz, and provides facilities not only for professional matches but also for community events and youth training. The stadium plays an important role in promoting physical activity and strengthening the city’s identity through sport.

== Notable people ==
- Piotr of Grudziądz (c. 1400–1480), composer
- Johann Stobäus (1580–1646), composer
- Alfred Wohl (1863–1946), German chemist
- Alexander Pohlmann (1865–1952), politician
- Max Winkler (1875–1961), Mayor of Graudenz
- Ernst Hardt (1876–1947), writer
- Waldemar Kophamel (1880–1934), U-boat commander
- Leo White (1882–1948), stage performer
- Hans Kyser writer, screenwriter, radio drama writer, and film director
- Alfons Hoffmann (1895–1963), Polish engineer
- Bolesław Orliński (1899–1992), Polish aviator and test pilot
- Kurt Weyher (1901–1991), Admiral
- Erich Witte (1911–2008), stage actor, operatic tenor and opera director
- Antoni Czortek (1915–2003), Polish boxing champion
- Henryk Sawistowski (1925–1984), dean of City and Guilds College of London Institute
- Waldemar Baszanowski (1935–2011), Olympic champion weightlifter
- Stefania Toczyska (born 1943), mezzo-soprano
- Bronisław Malinowski (1951–1981), Olympic Champion in the 3000m steeplechase race, 1980 Summer Olympics
- Mateusz "scriptwelder" Sokalszczuk (born 1985), flash game developer, author of Waterworks!, a game that takes place in the city
- Krzysztof Buczkowski (born 1986), motorcycle speedway rider

== Twin towns – sister cities ==
Grudziądz is twinned with:

Chernyakhovsk, Russia; Falun, Sweden	Gütersloh, Germany; Nanning, China

italicized that this city is suspended due to Russian Invasion of Ukraine.

== Sights ==
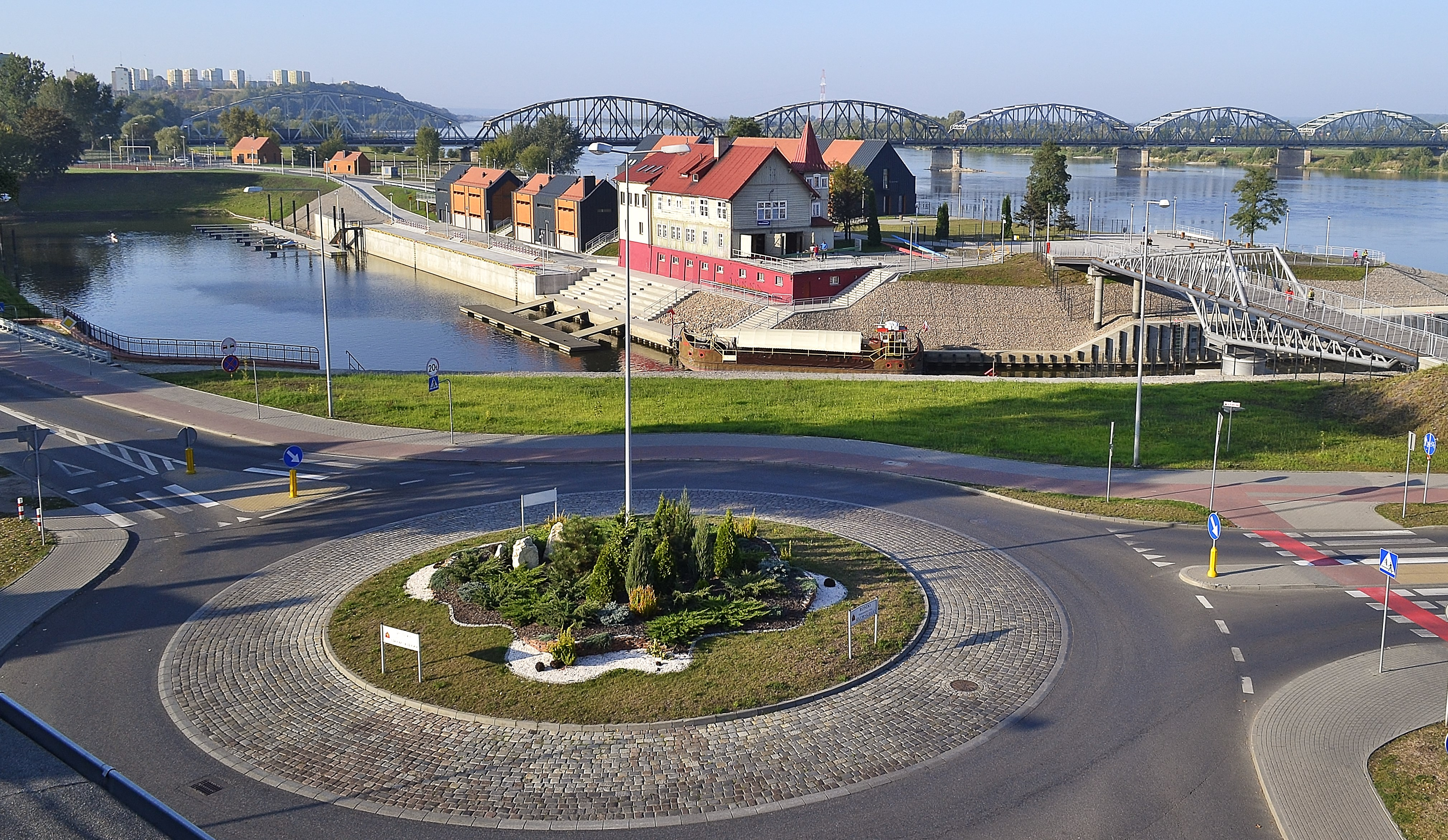
Szultz Port (at present Grudziadz Marina)

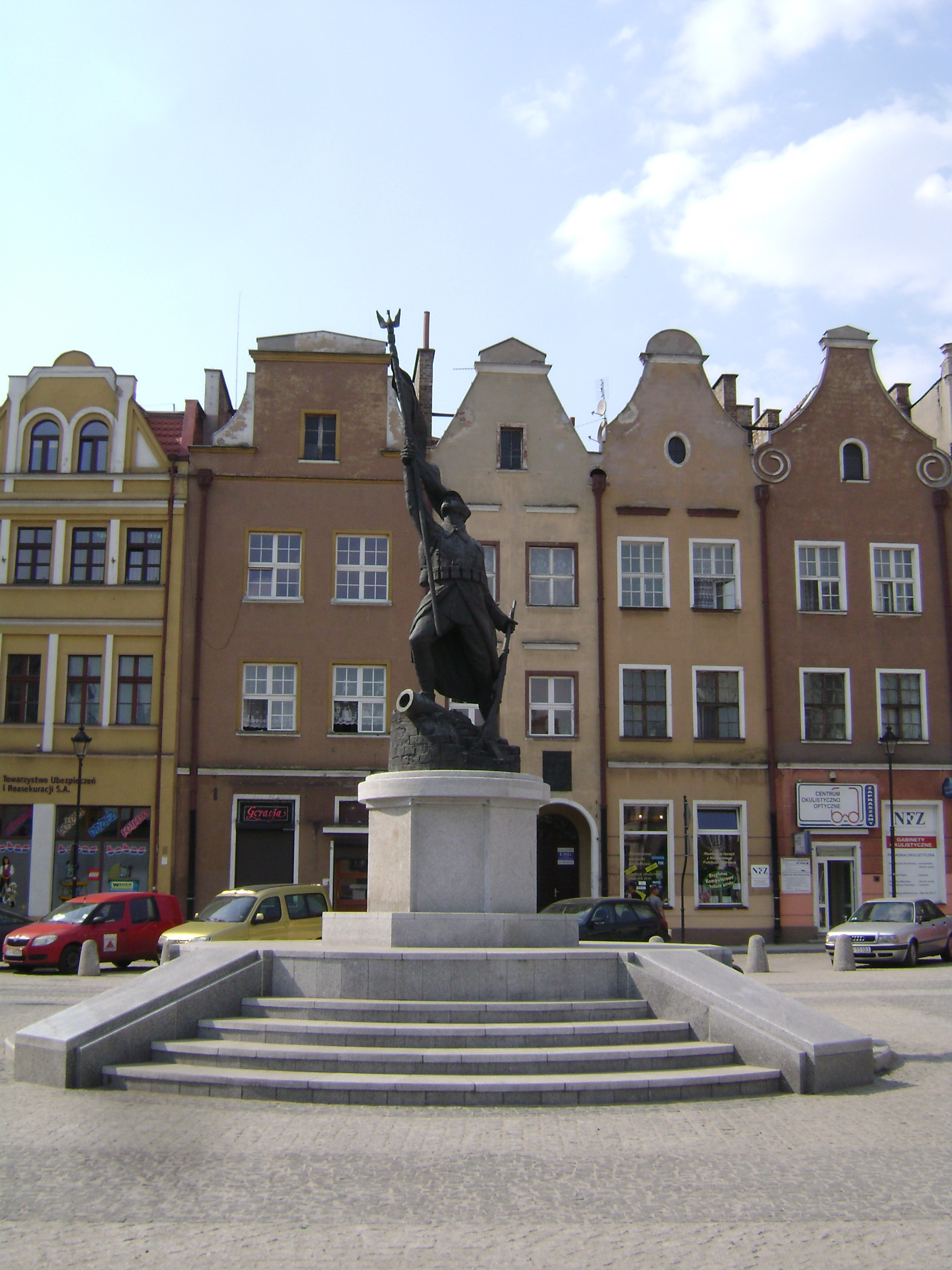
Memorial to Polish soldiers, main market square

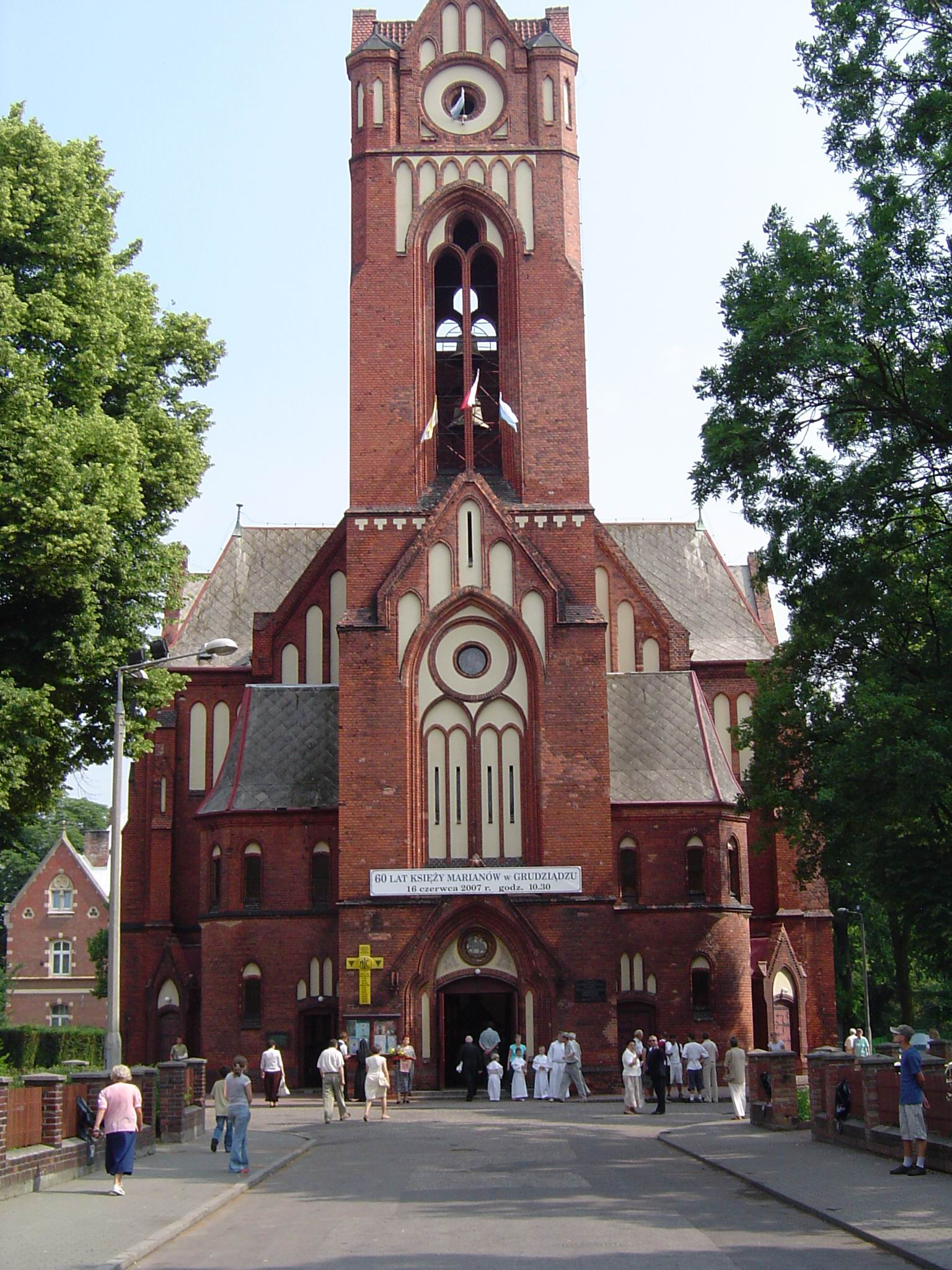
St. Mary's Church

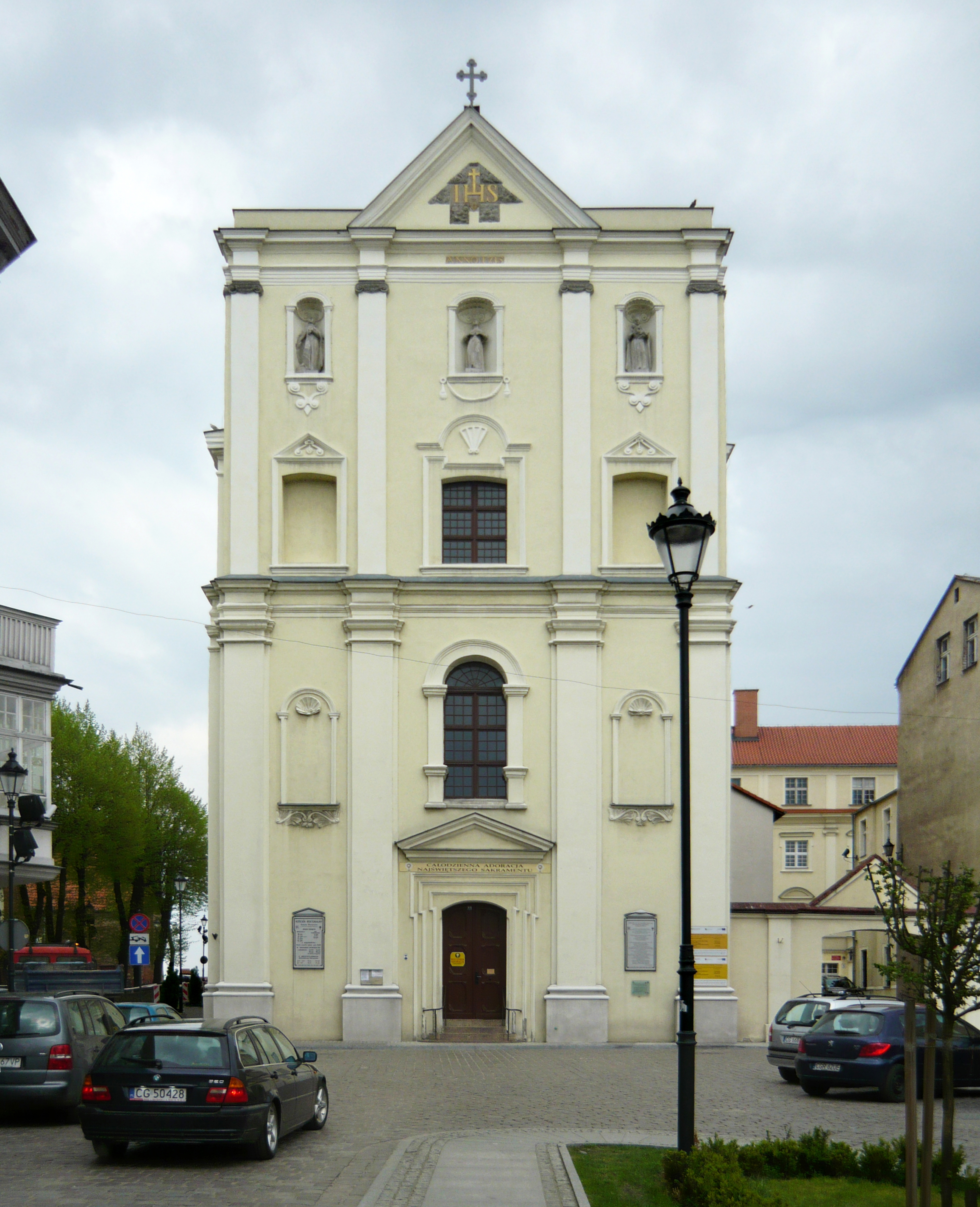
Church of St. Francis Xavier

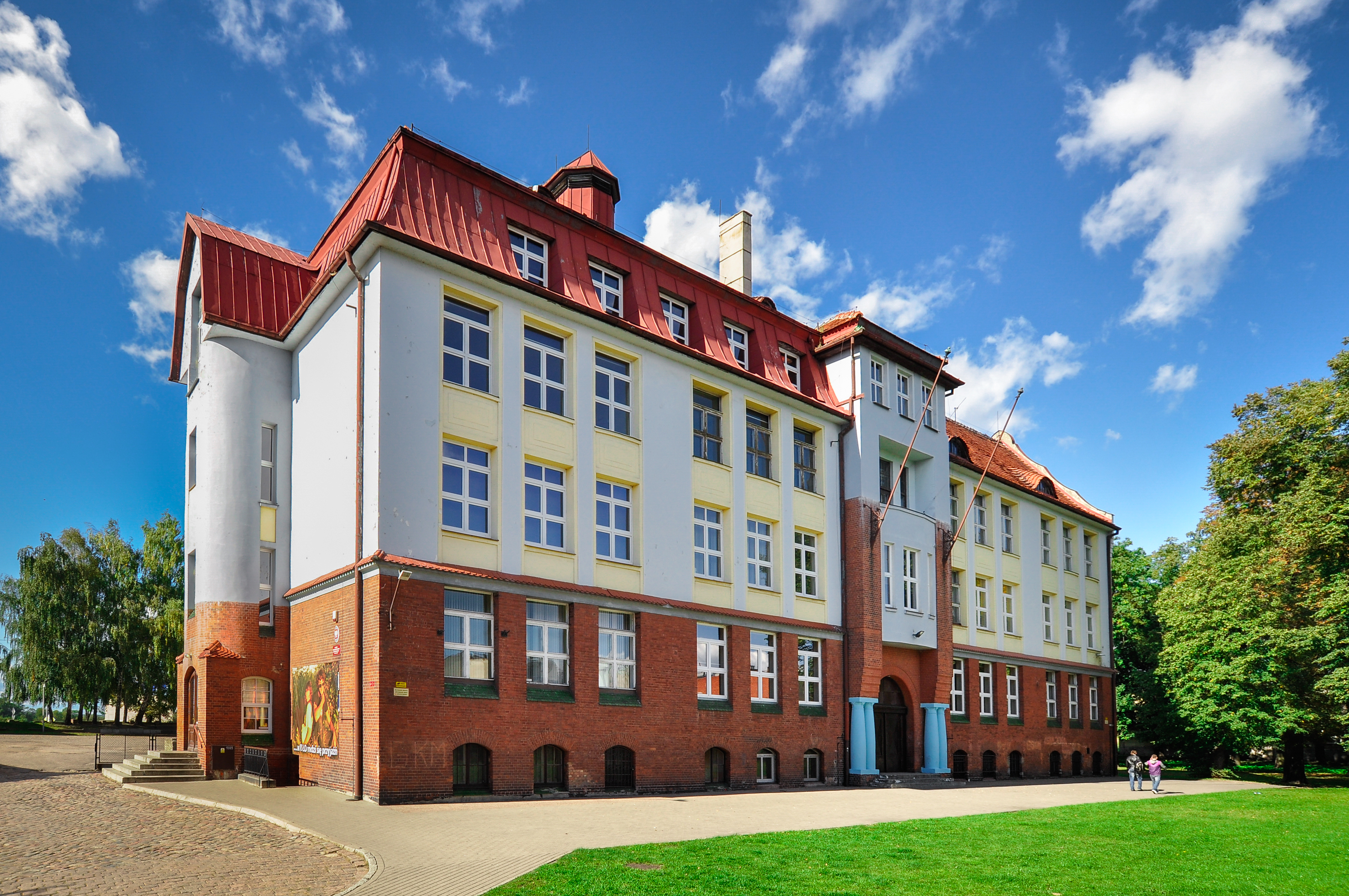
Sobieski High School

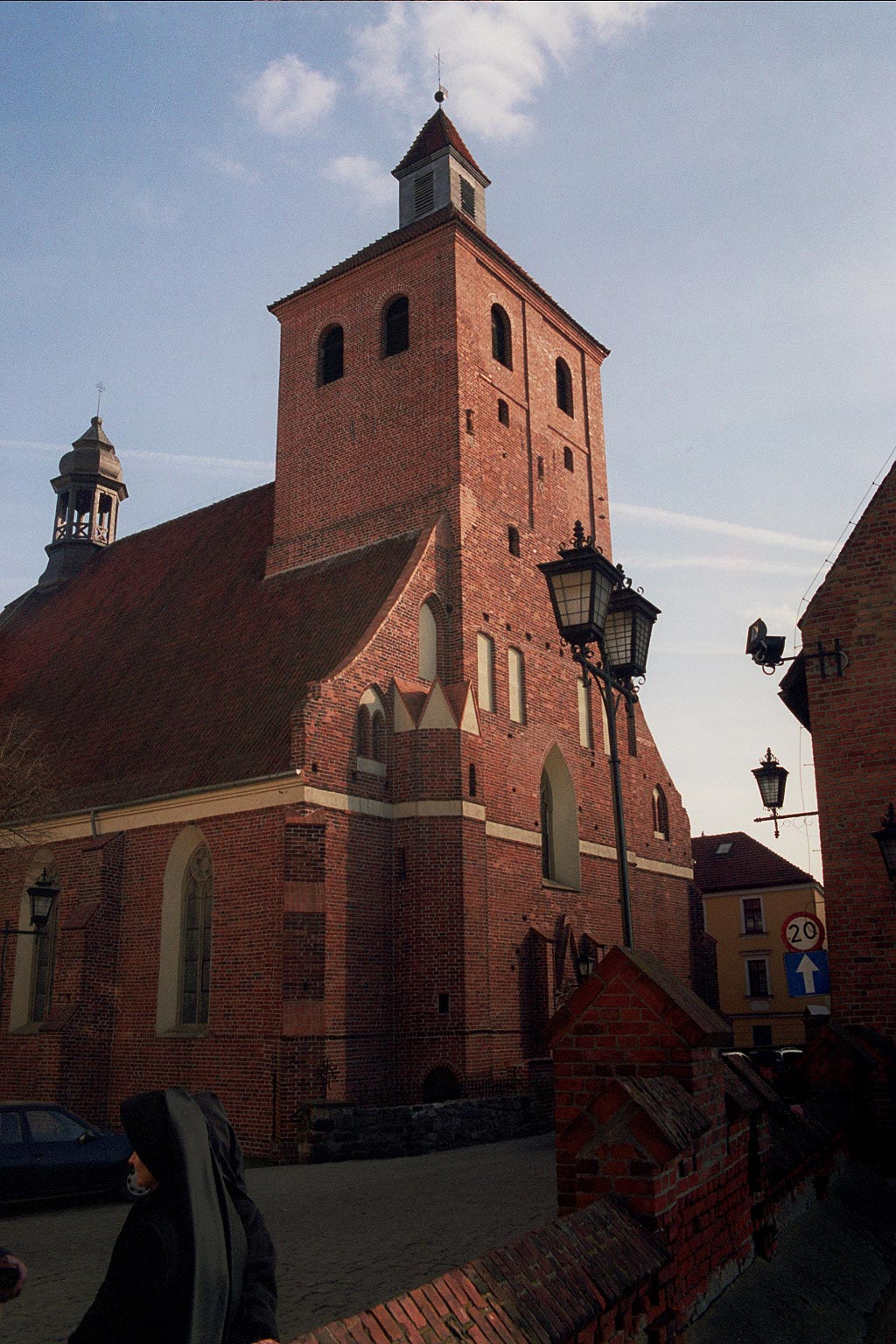
St. Nicholas' Basilica (Bazylika św. Mikołaja)

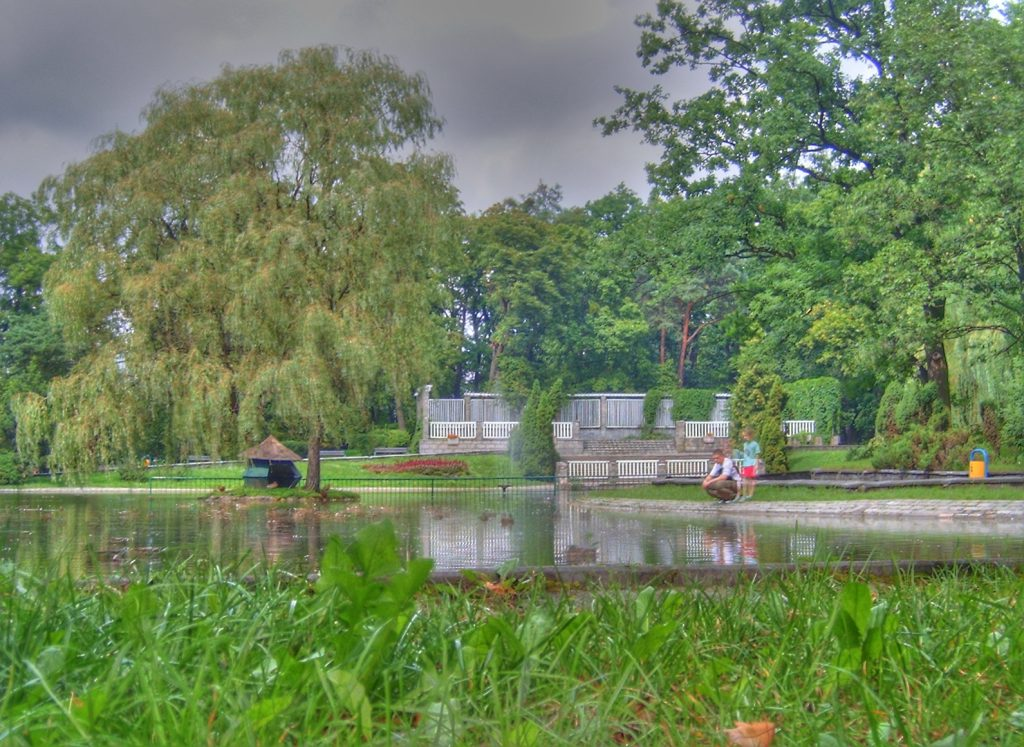
The Piotr Janowski City Park (Park Miejski im. Piotra Janowskiego)

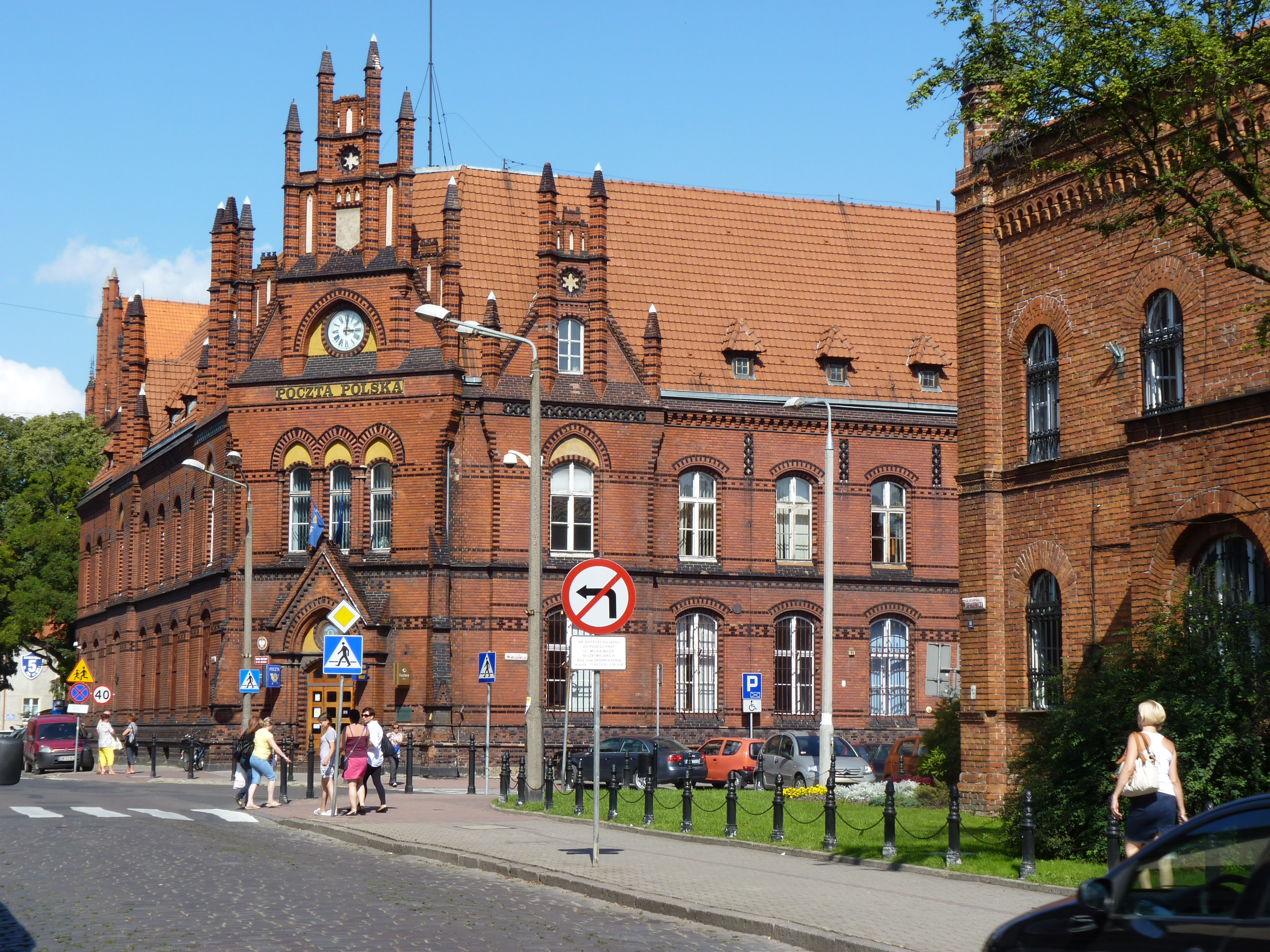
Main Post Office

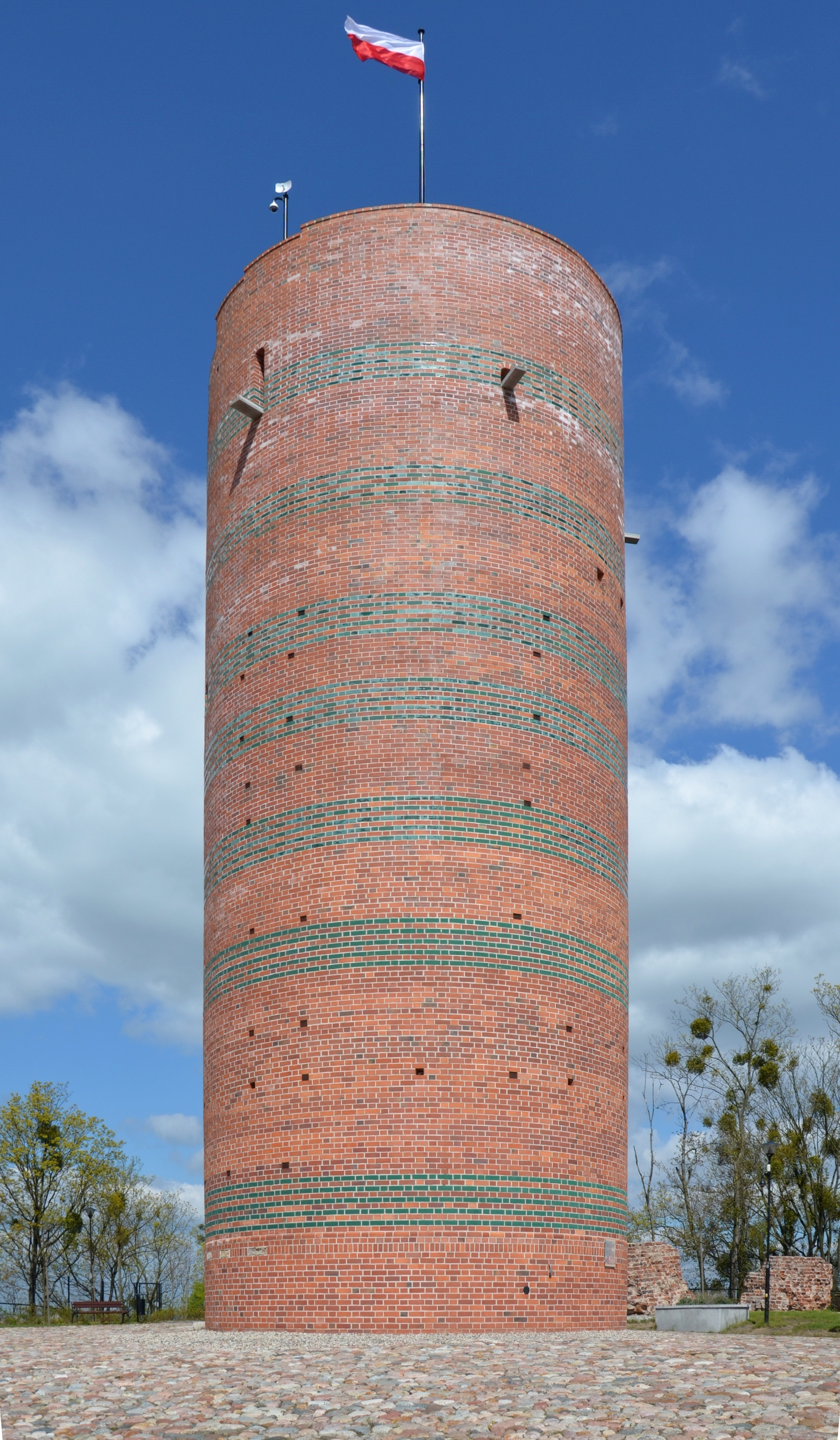
Klimek Tower (Wieża Klimek)

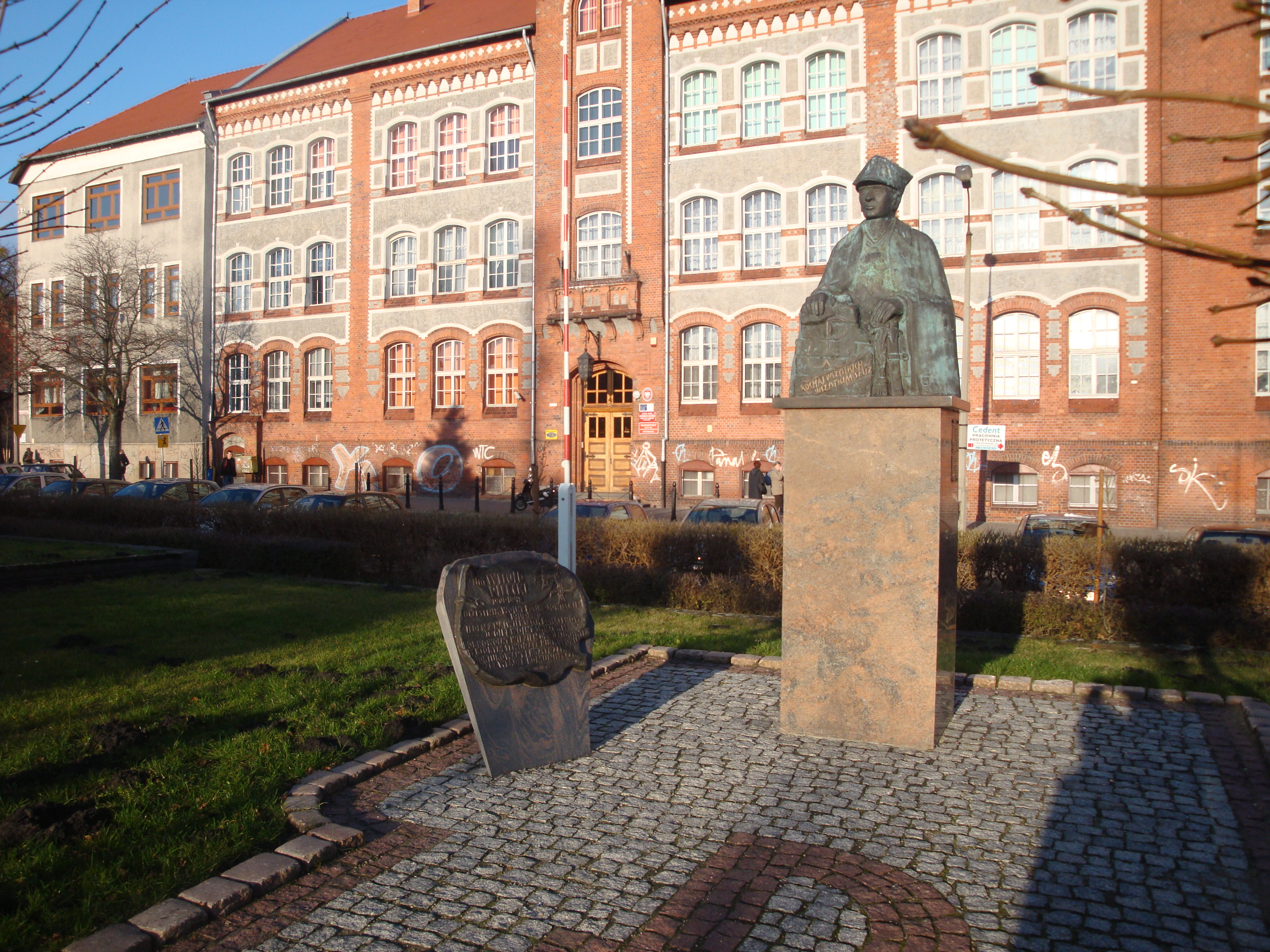
Witold Pilecki monument

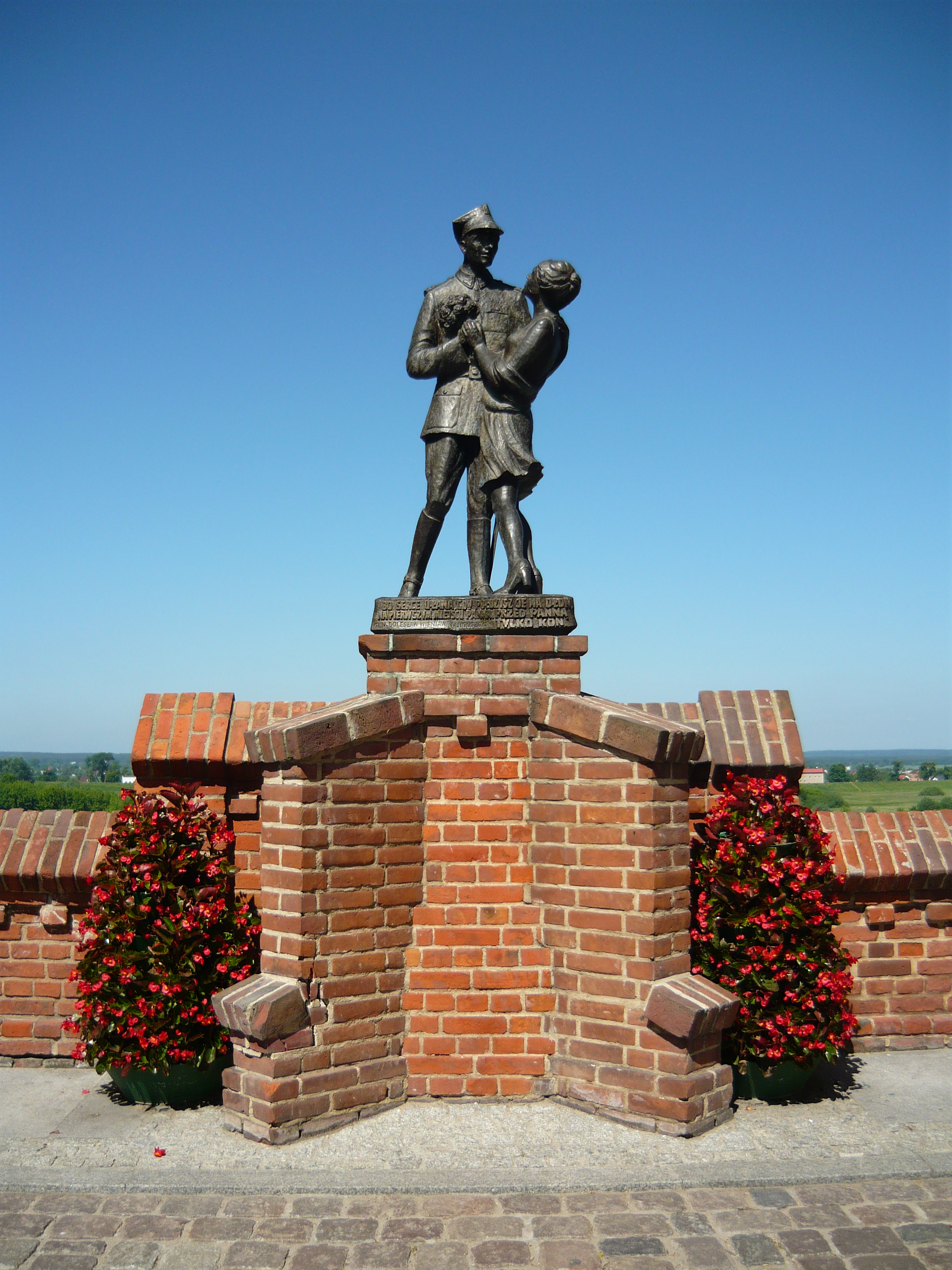
Uhlan and Girl Monument

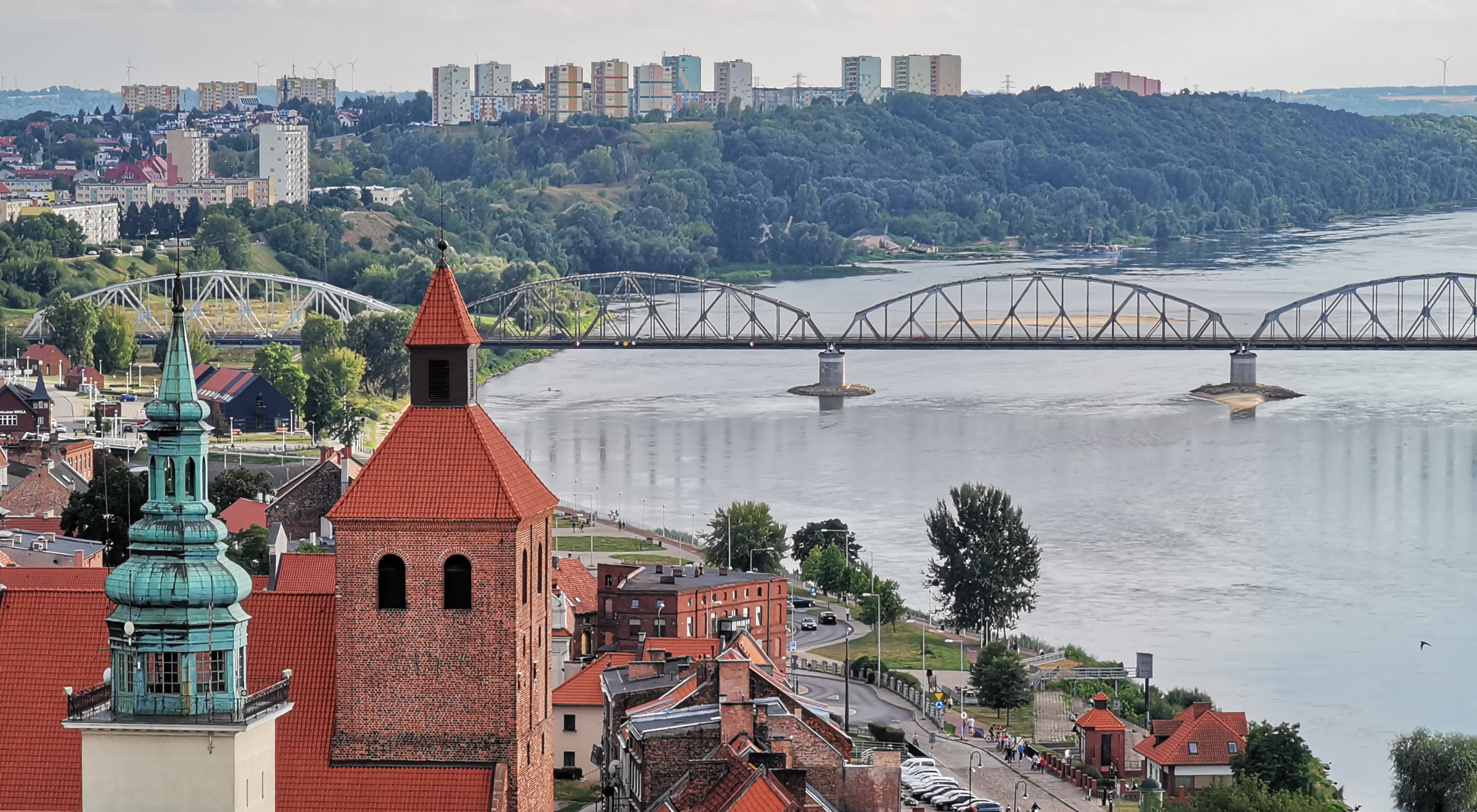
The Bronisław Malinowski Bridge

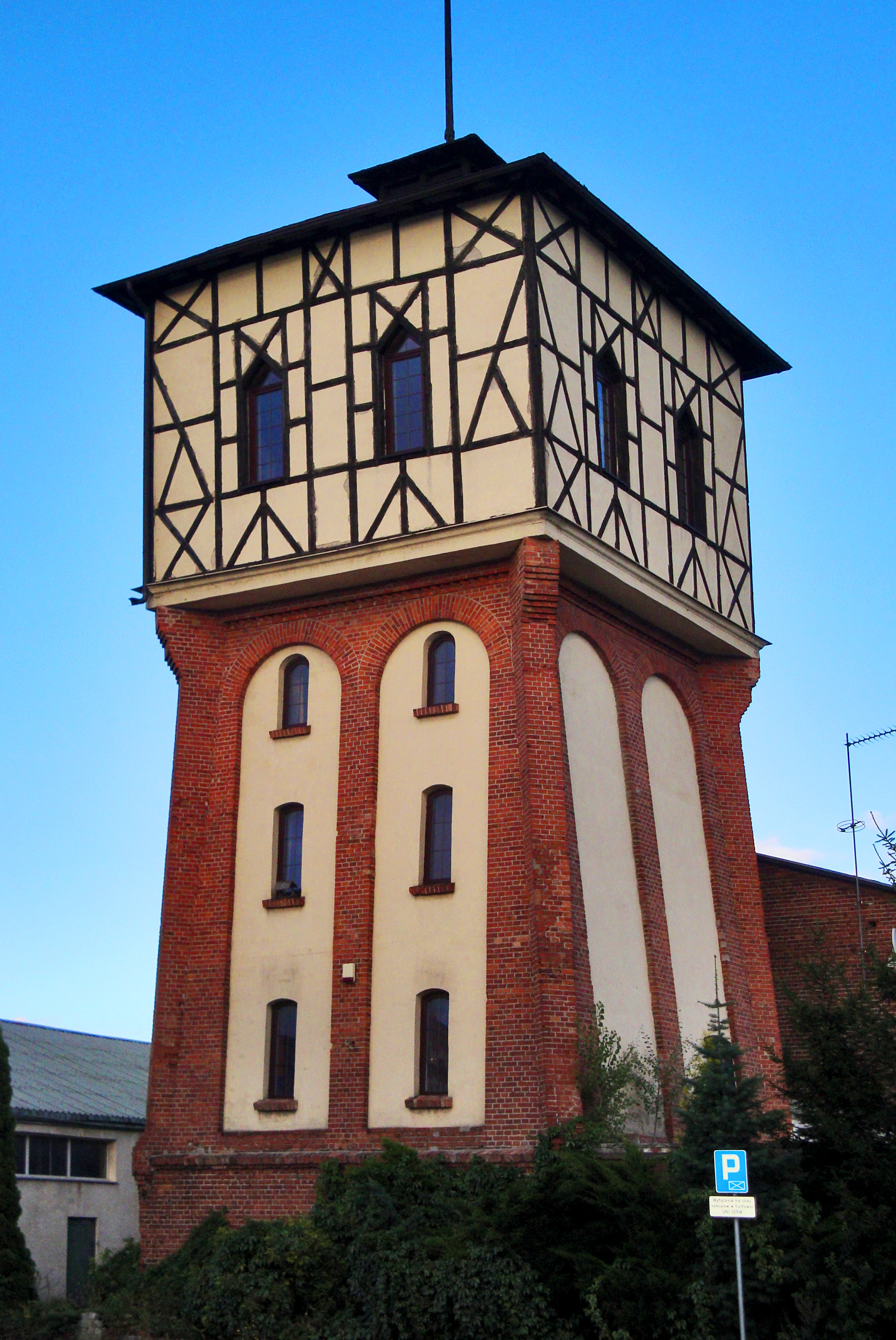
After factory water tower

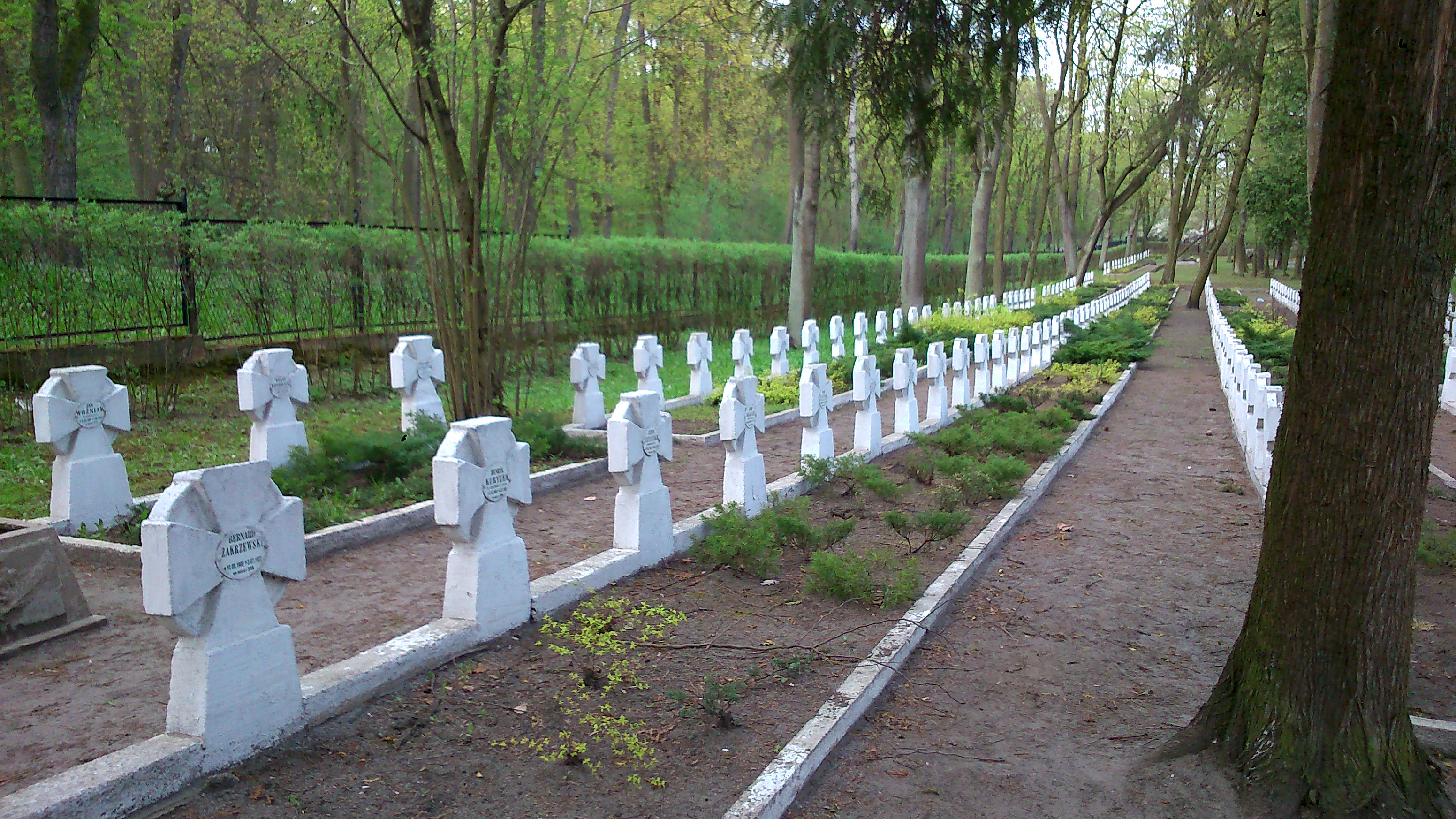
War cemetery

== See also ==
- Nazi repressions against the population of Grudziądz in 1939
