= List of instrumental works by Georg Philipp Telemann (TWV) =

This is a list of all instrumental works by Georg Philipp Telemann in the Telemann-Werke-Verzeichnis (Telemann Works Catalogue), abbreviated TWV, as catalogued by musicologist Martin Ruhnke.

The following tables contain Telemann's works as listed in the Telemann Portal and the Catalogue TWV.

Works not yet listed in TWV have not been included.

== Tables ==
=== TWV 30 – Fugues for keyboard ===
Section	Grouping	Catalogue	Title	Key	Scoring	Observation	URL
TWV 30	20 Little Fugues for Keyboard	TWV 30:1	Fugue	D major	keyboard	—	Catalogue TWV
TWV 30	20 Little Fugues for Keyboard	TWV 30:2	Fugue	A major	keyboard	—	Catalogue TWV
TWV 30	20 Little Fugues for Keyboard	TWV 30:3	Fugue	G major	keyboard	—	Catalogue TWV
TWV 30	20 Little Fugues for Keyboard	TWV 30:4	Fugue	E minor	keyboard	—	Catalogue TWV
TWV 30	20 Little Fugues for Keyboard	TWV 30:5	Fugue	D minor	keyboard	—	Catalogue TWV
TWV 30	20 Little Fugues for Keyboard	TWV 30:6	Fugue	C major	keyboard	—	Catalogue TWV
TWV 30	20 Little Fugues for Keyboard	TWV 30:7	Fugue	B minor	keyboard	—	Catalogue TWV
TWV 30	20 Little Fugues for Keyboard	TWV 30:8	Fugue	D major	keyboard	—	Catalogue TWV
TWV 30	20 Little Fugues for Keyboard	TWV 30:9	Fugue	A minor	keyboard	—	Catalogue TWV
TWV 30	20 Little Fugues for Keyboard	TWV 30:10	Fugue	E minor	keyboard	—	Catalogue TWV
TWV 30	20 Little Fugues for Keyboard	TWV 30:11	Fugue	C major	keyboard	—	Catalogue TWV
TWV 30	20 Little Fugues for Keyboard	TWV 30:12	Fugue	E minor	keyboard	—	Catalogue TWV
TWV 30	20 Little Fugues for Keyboard	TWV 30:13	Fugue	C minor	keyboard	—	Catalogue TWV
TWV 30	20 Little Fugues for Keyboard	TWV 30:14	Fugue	A minor	keyboard	—	Catalogue TWV
TWV 30	20 Little Fugues for Keyboard	TWV 30:15	Fugue	B minor	keyboard	—	Catalogue TWV
TWV 30	20 Little Fugues for Keyboard	TWV 30:16	Fugue	D minor	keyboard	—	Catalogue TWV
TWV 30	20 Little Fugues for Keyboard	TWV 30:17	Fugue	A minor	keyboard	—	Catalogue TWV
TWV 30	20 Little Fugues for Keyboard	TWV 30:18	Fugue	F major	keyboard	—	Catalogue TWV
TWV 30	20 Little Fugues for Keyboard	TWV 30:19	Fugue	G major	keyboard	—	Catalogue TWV
TWV 30	20 Little Fugues for Keyboard	TWV 30:20	Fugue	A minor	keyboard	—	Catalogue TWV
TWV 30	Fugues for Keyboard	TWV 30:21	Fugue	G minor	keyboard	—	Telemann Portal; Catalogue TWV
TWV 30	Fugues for Keyboard	TWV 30:22	Fugue	A major	keyboard	—	Telemann Portal; Catalogue TWV
TWV 30	Fugues for Keyboard	TWV 30:23	Fugue	C major	keyboard	—	Telemann Portal; Catalogue TWV
TWV 30	Fugues for Keyboard	TWV 30:24	Fugue	D minor	keyboard	—	Telemann Portal; Catalogue TWV
TWV 30	Fugues for Keyboard	TWV 30:25	Fugue	E minor	keyboard	—	Telemann Portal; Catalogue TWV
TWV 30	Fugues for Keyboard	TWV 30:26	Fugue	F major	keyboard	—	Telemann Portal; Catalogue TWV
TWV 30	—	TWV 30:27	Fughetta	F major	keyboard	—	Telemann Portal; Catalogue TWV
TWV 30	—	TWV 30:28	Fughetta	D major	keyboard	—	Telemann Portal; Catalogue TWV
TWV 30	—	TWV 30:29	Fugue	E minor	keyboard	—	Telemann Portal; Catalogue TWV
TWV 30	—	TWV 30:30	Fugue	D major	keyboard	—	Telemann Portal; Catalogue TWV
TWV 30	—	TWV 30:31	Canon	G minor	organ	—	Telemann Portal; Catalogue TWV
TWV 30	—	TWV Anh. 30:1	Fugue	A minor	keyboard	by Georg Michael Telemann	Catalogue TWV
TWV 30	—	TWV Anh. 30:2	Fugue alla capella	F major	keyboard	by Georg Michael Telemann	Catalogue TWV
TWV 30	—	TWV Anh. 30:3	Fugue	G minor	keyboard	Keyboard version of the Presto of the 2nd canon sonata for 2 flutes or violins or viola da gamba without basso continuo (TWV 40:119,1)	Telemann Portal; Catalogue TWV

=== TWV 31 – Chorale preludes ===
Section	Grouping	Catalogue	Title	Key	URL
TWV 31	Preludes in fugue style	TWV 31:1	Vater unser in Himmelreich	D minor	Telemann Portal; Catalogue TWV
TWV 31	Preludes in fugue style	TWV 31:2	Vater unser in Him	D minor	Telemann Portal; Catalogue TWV
TWV 31	Preludes in fugue style	TWV 31:3	Allein Gott in Hoh sei Ehr	G major	Telemann Portal; Catalogue TWV
TWV 31	Preludes in fugue style	TWV 31:4	Allein Gott in Hoh sei Ehr	G major	Telemann Portal; Catalogue TWV
TWV 31	Preludes in fugue style	TWV 31:5	Komm, heilger Geist	G major	Telemann Portal; Catalogue TWV
TWV 31	Preludes in fugue style	TWV 31:6	Komm, heilger Geist	G major	Telemann Portal; Catalogue TWV
TWV 31	Preludes in fugue style	TWV 31:7	Herr Jesu Christ, dich zu uns wend'	F major	Telemann Portal; Catalogue TWV
TWV 31	Preludes in fugue style	TWV 31:8	Herr Jesu Christ, dich zu uns wend'	F major	Catalogue TWV
TWV 31	Preludes in fugue style	TWV 31:9	Schmucke dich, o liebe Seele	E♭ major	Telemann Portal; Catalogue TWV
TWV 31	Preludes in fugue style	TWV 31:10	Schmucke dich, o liebe Seele	E♭ major	Telemann Portal; Catalogue TWV
TWV 31	Preludes in fugue style	TWV 31:11	Straf mich nicht in deinem Zorn	D minor	Telemann Portal; Catalogue TWV
TWV 31	Preludes in fugue style	TWV 31:12	Straf mich nicht in deinem Zorn	F major	Telemann Portal; Catalogue TWV
TWV 31	Preludes in fugue style	TWV 31:13	Ach wir armen Sunder	A major	Telemann Portal; Catalogue TWV
TWV 31	Preludes in fugue style	TWV 31:14	Ach wir armen Sunder	F♯ minor	Telemann Portal; Catalogue TWV
TWV 31	Preludes in fugue style	TWV 31:15	Alle Menschen mussen sterben	A major	Telemann Portal; Catalogue TWV
TWV 31	Preludes in fugue style	TWV 31:16	Alle Menschen mussen sterben	A major	Telemann Portal; Catalogue TWV
TWV 31	Preludes in fugue style	TWV 31:17	O Lamm Gottes unschuldig	G major	Telemann Portal; Catalogue TWV
TWV 31	Preludes in fugue style	TWV 31:18	O Lamm Gottes unschuldig	G major	Telemann Portal; Catalogue TWV
TWV 31	Preludes in fugue style	TWV 31:19	Ich ruf zu dir, Herr Jesu Christ	E minor	Telemann Portal; Catalogue TWV
TWV 31	Preludes in fugue style	TWV 31:20	Ich ruf zu dir, Herr Jesu Christ	G major	Telemann Portal; Catalogue TWV
TWV 31	Preludes in fugue style	TWV 31:21	Herzlich tut mich verlangen	C minor	Telemann Portal; Catalogue TWV
TWV 31	Preludes in fugue style	TWV 31:22	Herzlich tut mich verlangen	E♭ major	Telemann Portal; Catalogue TWV
TWV 31	Preludes in fugue style	TWV 31:23	Christus, der uns selig macht	G minor	Telemann Portal; Catalogue TWV
TWV 31	Preludes in fugue style	TWV 31:24	Christus, der uns selig macht	G minor	Telemann Portal; Catalogue TWV
TWV 31	Preludes in fugue style	TWV 31:25	Durch Adams Fall	A minor	Telemann Portal; Catalogue TWV
TWV 31	Preludes in fugue style	TWV 31:26	Durch Adams Fall	A minor	Telemann Portal; Catalogue TWV
TWV 31	Preludes in fugue style	TWV 31:27	Christ lag in Todesbanden	D minor	Telemann Portal; Catalogue TWV
TWV 31	Preludes in fugue style	TWV 31:28	Christ lag in Todesbanden	A minor	Telemann Portal; Catalogue TWV
TWV 31	Preludes in fugue style	TWV 31:29	Erschienen ist der herrlich Tag	B minor	Telemann Portal; Catalogue TWV
TWV 31	Preludes in fugue style	TWV 31:30	Erschienen ist der herrlich Tag	B minor	Telemann Portal; Catalogue TWV
TWV 31	Preludes in fugue style	TWV 31:31	Herr Christ, der eining Gottes Sohn	G major	Telemann Portal; Catalogue TWV
TWV 31	Preludes in fugue style	TWV 31:32	Herr Christ, der eining Gottes Sohn	G major	Telemann Portal; Catalogue TWV
TWV 31	Preludes in fugue style	TWV 31:33	Jesu, meine Freude	D minor	Telemann Portal; Catalogue TWV
TWV 31	Preludes in fugue style	TWV 31:34	Jesu, meine Freude	D minor	Telemann Portal; Catalogue TWV
TWV 31	Preludes in fugue style	TWV 31:35	Was mein Gott will, das g'scheh allzeit	A minor	Telemann Portal; Catalogue TWV
TWV 31	Preludes in fugue style	TWV 31:36	Was mein Gott will, das g'scheh allzeit	A minor	Telemann Portal; Catalogue TWV
TWV 31	Preludes in fugue style	TWV 31:37	Wie schon leuchet der Morgenstern	D major	Telemann Portal; Catalogue TWV
TWV 31	Preludes in fugue style	TWV 31:38	Wie schon leuchet der Morgenstern	D major	Telemann Portal; Catalogue TWV
TWV 31	Preludes in fugue style	TWV 31:39	Herr Jesu Christ, dich zu uns wend'	F major	Telemann Portal; Catalogue TWV
TWV 31	Preludes in fugue style	TWV 31:40	Herr Jesu Christ, dich zu uns wend'	F major	Telemann Portal; Catalogue TWV
TWV 31	Preludes in fugue style	TWV 31:41	Gott der Vater wohn uns bei	D major	Telemann Portal; Catalogue TWV
TWV 31	Preludes in fugue style	TWV 31:42	Gott der Vater wohn uns bei	D major	Telemann Portal; Catalogue TWV
TWV 31	Preludes in fugue style	TWV 31:43	Ach Gott von Himmel sieh darein	A minor	Telemann Portal; Catalogue TWV
TWV 31	Preludes in fugue style	TWV 31:44	Ach Gott von Himmel sieh darein	A minor	Telemann Portal; Catalogue TWV
TWV 31	Preludes in fugue style	TWV 31:45	Wer nur den lieben Gott lasst walten	A minor	Telemann Portal; Catalogue TWV
TWV 31	Preludes in fugue style	TWV 31:46	Wer nur den lieben Gott lasst walten	A minor	Telemann Portal; Catalogue TWV
TWV 31	Preludes in fugue style	TWV 31:47	Nun danket alle Gott	F major	Telemann Portal; Catalogue TWV
TWV 31	Preludes in fugue style	TWV 31:48	Nun danket alle Gott	F major	Telemann Portal; Catalogue TWV
TWV 31	—	TWV 31:49	Nun domm' der Heiden Heiland	A minor	Telemann Portal; Catalogue TWV
TWV 31	—	TWV 31:50	Befiehl du deine Wege	D minor	Telemann Portal; Catalogue TWV
TWV 31	—	TWV 31:51	Nun freut euch, lieben Christen g'mein	G major	Telemann Portal; Catalogue TWV
TWV 31	—	TWV 31:52	Nun freut euch, lieben Christen g'mein	G major	Telemann Portal; Catalogue TWV
TWV 31	—	TWV 31:53	Ermuntre dich, mein schwacher Geist	F major	Telemann Portal; Catalogue TWV
TWV 31	—	TWV 31:54	Nun freut euch, lieben Christen g'mein	G major	Telemann Portal; Catalogue TWV

=== TWV 32 – Suites for harpsichord ===
Section	Grouping	Catalogue	Title	Key	Scoring	Movements	Observation	URL
TWV 32	—	TWV 32:1	Partita	G major	harpsichord	1. Preludio; 2. Aria; 3. Rondeau; 4. Menuet I 5. Menuet II (G minor); 6. Gigue à l'angloise	—	Telemann Portal; Catalogue TWV
TWV 32	—	TWV 32:2	Ouverture à la polonaise	D minor	harpsichord	1. Ouverture à la polonoise 2. Bourrée; 3. Loure; 4. Gavotte en rondeau 5. Menuet; 6. Giga	—	Telemann Portal; Catalogue TWV
TWV 32	—	TWV 32:3	Solo	C major	harpsichord	1. Largo; 2. Allemanda; 3. Lura; 4. Corrente; 5. Menuet I 6. Menuet II; 7. Giga	—	Telemann Portal; Catalogue TWV
TWV 32	—	TWV 32:4	Solo	F major	harpsichord	1. Cantabile; 2. Bourrée; 3. Sarabande; 4. Gavotte; 5. Passepied; 6. Gigue	—	Telemann Portal; Catalogue TWV
TWV 32	Overtures with two following movements	TWV 32:5	Ouverture	G minor	harpsichord	1. Ouverture; 2. Larghetto e scherzando 3. Allegro (G major)	—	Telemann Portal; Catalogue TWV
TWV 32	Overtures with two following movements	TWV 32:6	Ouverture	A major	harpsichord	1. Ouverture; 2. Largo e scherzando (A minor); 3. Presto	—	Telemann Portal; Catalogue TWV
TWV 32	Overtures with two following movements	TWV 32:7	Ouverture	F major	harpsichord	1. Ouverture; 2. Dolce e scherzando (D minor); 3. No Title	—	Telemann Portal; Catalogue TWV
TWV 32	Overtures with two following movements	TWV 32:8	Ouverture	E minor	harpsichord	1. Ouverture; 2. Moderado e scherzando (G major); 3. Allegro; 4. Piacevole (G major)	—	Telemann Portal; Catalogue TWV
TWV 32	Overtures with two following movements	TWV 32:9	Ouverture	E♭ major	harpsichord	1. Ouverture; 2. Suave e scherzando (C minor); 3. Vivace	—	Telemann Portal; Catalogue TWV
TWV 32	Overtures with two following movements	TWV 32:10	Ouverture	B minor	harpsichord	1. Ouverture; 2. Pastorello, tempo giusto (D major); 3. Allegro	—	Telemann Portal; Catalogue TWV
TWV 32	—	TWV 32:11	Ouverture	C major	harpsichord	1. Ouverture; 2. Entrée; 3. Gavotte; 4. Marche; 5. Gigue	—	Telemann Portal; Catalogue TWV
TWV 32	—	TWV 32:12	Ouverture	A minor	harpsichord	1. Ouverture; 2. Gavotte; 3. Loure; 4. Allemande; 5. Menuet I 6. Menuet II (A major); 7. Bourrée; 8. Gigue	—	Telemann Portal; Catalogue TWV
TWV 32	—	TWV 32:13	Ouverture	G major	harpsichord	1. Ouverture; 2. Courante; 3. Bourrée I 4. Bourrée (G minor); 5. Aria; 6. Allemande; 7. Menuet (avec trio)	= BWV 840	Telemann Portal; Catalogue TWV
TWV 32	—	TWV 32:14	Suite	A major	harpsichord	1. Allemande; 2. Courante; 3. Gigue	= BWV 824	Telemann Portal; Catalogue TWV
TWV 32	—	TWV 32:15	Ouverture	A major	harpsichord	1. Ouverture; 2. Courante; 3. Rigaudon I 4. Rigaudon II; 5. Hornpipe	—	Telemann Portal; Catalogue TWV
TWV 32	—	TWV 32:16	Ouverture	A major	harpsichord	1. Prélude vistement 2. Passepied I 3. Passepied II (A minor); 4. Aria; 5. Bourrée; 6. Loure; 7. Menuet & Trio; 8. Gigue	—	Telemann Portal; Catalogue TWV
TWV 32	—	TWV 32:17	Suite	C major	harpsichord	1. Allemande; 2. Hornpipe; 3. Rondeau; 4. Gigue; 5. Bourrée I 6. Bourrée II (C minor)	—	Telemann Portal; Catalogue TWV
TWV 32	—	TWV 32:18	Partita	A major	harpsichord	1. Allemande; 2. Air pour les trompettes 3. Sarabande; 4. Bourrée; 5. Gigue	—	Telemann Portal; Catalogue TWV
TWV 32	—	TWV Anh. 32:1	Ouverture	E♭ major	harpsichord	—	Harpsichord version of Ouverture TWV 55:Es4	Telemann Portal; Catalogue TWV
TWV 32	—	TWV Anh. 32:2	Rigaudon in A minor & Passepied in A major	A minor / A major	harpsichord	—	Harpsichord version of the Ouverture TWV 55:Es4	Telemann Portal; Catalogue TWV
TWV 32	—	TWV Anh. 32:3	Partita	B♭ major	harpsichord	—	By Christian Pezold	Catalogue TWV
TWV 32	—	TWV Anh. 32:4	Sarabande et Raigaudon	G major	harpsichord	—	—	Telemann Portal; Catalogue TWV
TWV 32	—	TWV Anh. 32:5	Ouverture	E major	oboe, strings and basso continuo	—	4th movement: Air for Organ	Telemann Portal; Catalogue TWV

=== TWV 33 – Fantasies, sonatas, concertos for harpsichord ===
Section	Catalogue	Title	Key	Scoring	Movements	Observation	URL
TWV 33	TWV 33:1	Fantasia	D major	harpsichord	1. Allegro; 2. Adagio (B minor); 3. Allegro (da capo)	—	Telemann Portal; Catalogue TWV
TWV 33	TWV 33:2	Fantasia	D minor	harpsichord	1. Presto; 2. Adagio (G minor); 3. Presto (da capo)	—	Telemann Portal; Catalogue TWV
TWV 33	TWV 33:3	Fantasia	E major	harpsichord	1. Vivace; 2. Largo (C♯ minor); 3. Vivace (da capo)	—	Telemann Portal; Catalogue TWV
TWV 33	TWV 33:4	Fantasia	E minor	harpsichord	1. Allegro; 2. Dolce (G major); 3. Allegro (da capo)	—	Telemann Portal; Catalogue TWV
TWV 33	TWV 33:5	Fantasia	F major	harpsichord	1. Vivace; 2. Largo (D minor); 3. Vivace (da capo)	—	Telemann Portal; Catalogue TWV
TWV 33	TWV 33:6	Fantasia	C minor	harpsichord	1. Tempo di Minuetto (F minor); 2. Largo (A♭ major); 3. Tempo di Minuetto (da capo)	—	Telemann Portal; Catalogue TWV
TWV 33	TWV 33:7	Fantasia	G major	harpsichord	1. Presto; 2. Largo (E minor); 3. Presto (da capo)	—	Telemann Portal; Catalogue TWV
TWV 33	TWV 33:8	Fantasia	G minor	harpsichord	1. Vivace; 2. Cantabile; 3. Vivace (da capo)	—	Telemann Portal; Catalogue TWV
TWV 33	TWV 33:9	Fantasia	A major	harpsichord	1. Allegro; 2. Grave (F♯ minor); 3. Allegro (da capo)	—	Telemann Portal; Catalogue TWV
TWV 33	TWV 33:10	Fantasia	A minor	harpsichord	1. Allegro; 2. Largo (C major); 3. Allegro (da capo)	—	Telemann Portal; Catalogue TWV
TWV 33	TWV 33:11	Fantasia	G minor	harpsichord	1. Allegro (B♭ major); 2. Largo; 3. Allegro (da capo)	—	Telemann Portal; Catalogue TWV
TWV 33	TWV 33:12	Fantasia	E♭ major	harpsichord	1. Vivace; 2. Largo; 3. Vivace (da capo)	—	Telemann Portal; Catalogue TWV
TWV 33	TWV 33:13	Fantasia	C minor	harpsichord	1. Tendrement; 2. Vivement; 3. Tendrement (da capo); 4. Très vite	—	Telemann Portal; Catalogue TWV
TWV 33	TWV 33:14	Fantasia	C major	harpsichord	1. Gravement; 2. Gayment; 3. Gravement (da capo); 4. Allegrement	—	Telemann Portal; Catalogue TWV
TWV 33	TWV 33:15	Fantasia	B minor	harpsichord	1. Pompeusement (D major); 2. Allegrement; 3. Pompeusement (da capo); 4. Gayment	—	Telemann Portal; Catalogue TWV
TWV 33	TWV 33:16	Fantasia	D major	harpsichord	1. Gratieusement; 2. Vivement; 3. Gratieusement (da capo); 4. Vite	—	Telemann Portal; Catalogue TWV
TWV 33	TWV 33:17	Fantasia	G minor	harpsichord	1. Mélodieusement; 2. Spirituellement; 3. Mélodieusement; 4. Vite	—	Telemann Portal; Catalogue TWV
TWV 33	TWV 33:18	Fantasia	B♭ major	—	1. Tendrement; 2. Gayment; 3. Tendrement (da capo); 4. Vite	—	Telemann Portal; Catalogue TWV
TWV 33	TWV 33:19	Fantasia	A minor	harpsichord	1. Lentement; 2. Allègrement; 3. Lentement (da capo); 4. Vivement	—	Telemann Portal; Catalogue TWV
TWV 33	TWV 33:20	Fantasia	A major	harpsichord	1. Gratieusement; 2. Vite; 3. Gratieusement (da capo); 4. Gayment	—	Telemann Portal; Catalogue TWV
TWV 33	TWV 33:21	Fantasia	E minor	harpsichord	1. Flateusement; 2. Vivement; 3. Flateusement (da capo); 4. Très vite	—	Telemann Portal; Catalogue TWV
TWV 33	TWV 33:22	Fantasia	G major	harpsichord	1. Modérément; 2. Vivement; 3. Modérément (da capo); 4. Gayment	—	Telemann Portal; Catalogue TWV
TWV 33	TWV 33:23	Fantasia	G minor	harpsichord	1. Pompeusement; 2. Allègrement; 3. Pompeusement (da capo); 4. Vite	—	Telemann Portal; Catalogue TWV
TWV 33	TWV 33:24	Fantasia	B♭ major	harpsichord	1. Gratieusement; 2. Garillardement; 3. Gratieusement (da capo); 4. Vitement	—	Telemann Portal; Catalogue TWV
TWV 33	TWV 33:25	Fantasia	F major	harpsichord	1. Vivace; 2. Tempo giusto 3. Vivace (da capo)	—	Telemann Portal; Catalogue TWV
TWV 33	TWV 33:26	Fantasia	D minor	harpsichord	1. Vivace; 2. Largo (A minor); 3. Vivace (da capo)	—	Telemann Portal; Catalogue TWV
TWV 33	TWV 33:27	Fantasia	E minor	harpsichord	1. Tempo giusto 2. Presto (G major); 3. Tempo giusto (da capo)	—	Telemann Portal; Catalogue TWV
TWV 33	TWV 33:28	Fantasia	G major	harpsichord	1. Vivace; 2. Dolce (B minor); 3. Vivace (da capo)	—	Telemann Portal; Catalogue TWV
TWV 33	TWV 33:29	Fantasia	G minor	harpsichord	1. Allegro; 2. Soave; 3. Allegro (da capo)	—	Telemann Portal; Catalogue TWV
TWV 33	TWV 33:30	Fantasia	C minor	harpsichord	1. Gratioso; 2. Vivace (E♭ major); 3. Gratioso (da capo)	—	Telemann Portal; Catalogue TWV
TWV 33	TWV 33:31	Fantasia	A major	harpsichord	1. Presto; 2. Arioso; 3. Presto (da capo)	—	Telemann Portal; Catalogue TWV
TWV 33	TWV 33:32	Fantasia	A minor	harpsichord	1. Vivace; 2. Minuet; 3. Vivace (da capo)	—	Telemann Portal; Catalogue TWV
TWV 33	TWV 33:33	Fantasia	B minor	harpsichord	1. Allegro; 2. Con pompa (D major); 3. Allegro (da capo)	—	Telemann Portal; Catalogue TWV
TWV 33	TWV 33:34	Fantasia	D major	harpsichord	1. Allegro; 2. Dolce (D minor); 3. Allegro (da capo)	—	Telemann Portal; Catalogue TWV
TWV 33	TWV 33:35	Fantasia	E♭ major	harpsichord	1. Vivace; 2. Moderato (C minor); 3. Vivace (da capo)	—	Telemann Portal; Catalogue TWV
TWV 33	TWV 33:36	Fantasia	B♭ major	harpsichord	1. Vivace; 2. Arioso (G minor); 3. Vivace (da capo)	—	Telemann Portal; Catalogue TWV
TWV 33	TWV 33:37	Sonata	E minor	harpsichord	1. Aria; 2. Tempo di Menuet; 3. Rondeau; 4. Presto (E major); 5. Menuet (E major)	—	Telemann Portal; Catalogue TWV
TWV 33	TWV Anh. 33:1	Concerto	B minor	harpsichord	1. Allegro; 2. Adagio; 3. Allegro	—	Telemann Portal; Catalogue TWV
TWV 33	TWV Anh. 33:2	Concerto	C minor	harpsichord	—	Transcribed for organ by J.G. Walther	Telemann Portal; Catalogue TWV
TWV 33	TWV Anh. 33:3	Fantasia	D major	organ	—	By T. Fedtke	Catalogue TWV
TWV 33	TWV Anh. 33:4	Sonata	D major	organ	—	Version for 2 keyboards and pedal of Sonata TWV 42:E4	Telemann Portal; Catalogue TWV
TWV 33	TWV Anh. 33:5	Sonata	D major	organ	—	Version for 2 keyboards and pedal of Sonata TWV 42:D14	Telemann Portal; Catalogue TWV
TWV 33	TWV Anh. 33:6	Concerto	B♭ major	violin, strings and continuo	—	Adapted for organ	Telemann Portal; Catalogue TWV
TWV 33	TWV Anh. 33:7	Concerto	G minor	keyboard	—	= TWV 51:g1, BWV 985	Telemann Portal; Catalogue TWV

=== TWV 34 – Minuets for harpsichord ===
Section	Grouping	Catalogue	Title	Key	Scoring	URL
TWV 34	50 Menuets (First Series)	TWV 34:1	Menuet	A minor	harpsichord	Telemann Portal; Catalogue TWV
TWV 34	50 Menuets (First Series)	TWV 34:2	Menuet	A major	harpsichord	Telemann Portal; Catalogue TWV
TWV 34	50 Menuets (First Series)	TWV 34:3	Menuet	A minor	harpsichord	Telemann Portal; Catalogue TWV
TWV 34	50 Menuets (First Series)	TWV 34:4	Menuet	A major	harpsichord	Telemann Portal; Catalogue TWV
TWV 34	50 Menuets (First Series)	TWV 34:5	Menuet	A major	harpsichord	Telemann Portal; Catalogue TWV
TWV 34	50 Menuets (First Series)	TWV 34:6	Menuet	A major	harpsichord	Telemann Portal; Catalogue TWV
TWV 34	50 Menuets (First Series)	TWV 34:7	Menuet	A minor	harpsichord	Telemann Portal; Catalogue TWV
TWV 34	50 Menuets (First Series)	TWV 34:8	Menuet	B♭ major	harpsichord	Telemann Portal; Catalogue TWV
TWV 34	50 Menuets (First Series)	TWV 34:9	Menuet	B♭ major	harpsichord	Telemann Portal; Catalogue TWV
TWV 34	50 Menuets (First Series)	TWV 34:10	Menuet	B♭ major	harpsichord	Telemann Portal; Catalogue TWV
TWV 34	50 Menuets (First Series)	TWV 34:11	Menuet	B♭ major	harpsichord	Telemann Portal; Catalogue TWV
TWV 34	50 Menuets (First Series)	TWV 34:12	Menuet	B minor	harpsichord	Telemann Portal; Catalogue TWV
TWV 34	50 Menuets (First Series)	TWV 34:13	Menuet	B minor	harpsichord	Telemann Portal; Catalogue TWV
TWV 34	50 Menuets (First Series)	TWV 34:14	Menuet	B minor	harpsichord	Telemann Portal; Catalogue TWV
TWV 34	50 Menuets (First Series)	TWV 34:15	Menuet	C minor	harpsichord	Telemann Portal; Catalogue TWV
TWV 34	50 Menuets (First Series)	TWV 34:16	Menuet	C major	harpsichord	Telemann Portal; Catalogue TWV
TWV 34	50 Menuets (First Series)	TWV 34:17	Menuet	C minor	harpsichord	Telemann Portal; Catalogue TWV
TWV 34	50 Menuets (First Series)	TWV 34:18	Menuet	C major	harpsichord	Telemann Portal; Catalogue TWV
TWV 34	50 Menuets (First Series)	TWV 34:19	Menuet	E♭ major	harpsichord	Telemann Portal; Catalogue TWV
TWV 34	50 Menuets (First Series)	TWV 34:20	Menuet	C major	harpsichord	Telemann Portal; Catalogue TWV
TWV 34	50 Menuets (First Series)	TWV 34:21	Menuet	C major	harpsichord	Telemann Portal; Catalogue TWV
TWV 34	50 Menuets (First Series)	TWV 34:22	Menuet	D minor	harpsichord	Telemann Portal; Catalogue TWV
TWV 34	50 Menuets (First Series)	TWV 34:23	Menuet	D major	harpsichord	Telemann Portal; Catalogue TWV
TWV 34	50 Menuets (First Series)	TWV 34:24	Menuet	D major	harpsichord	Telemann Portal; Catalogue TWV
TWV 34	50 Menuets (First Series)	TWV 34:25	Menuet	D major	harpsichord	Telemann Portal; Catalogue TWV
TWV 34	50 Menuets (First Series)	TWV 34:26	Menuet	D minor	harpsichord	Telemann Portal; Catalogue TWV
TWV 34	50 Menuets (First Series)	TWV 34:27	Menuet	E♭ major	harpsichord	Telemann Portal; Catalogue TWV
TWV 34	50 Menuets (First Series)	TWV 34:28	Menuet	E♭ major	harpsichord	Telemann Portal; Catalogue TWV
TWV 34	50 Menuets (First Series)	TWV 34:29	Menuet	E minor	harpsichord	Telemann Portal; Catalogue TWV
TWV 34	50 Menuets (First Series)	TWV 34:30	Menuet	E minor	harpsichord	Telemann Portal; Catalogue TWV
TWV 34	50 Menuets (First Series)	TWV 34:31	Menuet	E minor	harpsichord	Telemann Portal; Catalogue TWV
TWV 34	50 Menuets (First Series)	TWV 34:32	Menuet	E minor	harpsichord	Telemann Portal; Catalogue TWV
TWV 34	50 Menuets (First Series)	TWV 34:33	Menuet	E major	harpsichord	Telemann Portal; Catalogue TWV
TWV 34	50 Menuets (First Series)	TWV 34:34	Menuet	E major	harpsichord	Telemann Portal; Catalogue TWV
TWV 34	50 Menuets (First Series)	TWV 34:35	Menuet	E major	harpsichord	Telemann Portal; Catalogue TWV
TWV 34	50 Menuets (First Series)	TWV 34:36	Menuet	F major	harpsichord	Telemann Portal; Catalogue TWV
TWV 34	50 Menuets (First Series)	TWV 34:37	Menuet	F major	harpsichord	Telemann Portal; Catalogue TWV
TWV 34	50 Menuets (First Series)	TWV 34:38	Menuet	F minor	harpsichord	Telemann Portal; Catalogue TWV
TWV 34	50 Menuets (First Series)	TWV 34:39	Menuet	F major	harpsichord	Telemann Portal; Catalogue TWV
TWV 34	50 Menuets (First Series)	TWV 34:40	Menuet	F minor	harpsichord	Telemann Portal; Catalogue TWV
TWV 34	50 Menuets (First Series)	TWV 34:41	Menuet	F major	harpsichord	Telemann Portal; Catalogue TWV
TWV 34	50 Menuets (First Series)	TWV 34:42	Menuet	F minor	harpsichord	Telemann Portal; Catalogue TWV
TWV 34	50 Menuets (First Series)	TWV 34:43	Menuet	G minor	harpsichord	Telemann Portal; Catalogue TWV
TWV 34	50 Menuets (First Series)	TWV 34:44	Menuet	G minor	harpsichord	Telemann Portal; Catalogue TWV
TWV 34	50 Menuets (First Series)	TWV 34:45	Menuet	G minor	harpsichord	Telemann Portal; Catalogue TWV
TWV 34	50 Menuets (First Series)	TWV 34:46	Menuet	G minor	harpsichord	Telemann Portal; Catalogue TWV
TWV 34	50 Menuets (First Series)	TWV 34:47	Menuet	G major	harpsichord	Telemann Portal; Catalogue TWV
TWV 34	50 Menuets (First Series)	TWV 34:48	Menuet	G major	harpsichord	Telemann Portal; Catalogue TWV
TWV 34	50 Menuets (First Series)	TWV 34:49	Menuet	G major	harpsichord	Telemann Portal; Catalogue TWV
TWV 34	50 Menuets (First Series)	TWV 34:50	Menuet	G major	harpsichord	Telemann Portal; Catalogue TWV
TWV 34	50 Menuets (Second Series)	TWV 34:51	Menuet	A major	harpsichord	Telemann Portal; Catalogue TWV
TWV 34	50 Menuets (Second Series)	TWV 34:52	Menuet	A major	harpsichord	Telemann Portal; Catalogue TWV
TWV 34	50 Menuets (Second Series)	TWV 34:53	Menuet	A major	harpsichord	Telemann Portal; Catalogue TWV
TWV 34	50 Menuets (Second Series)	TWV 34:54	Menuet	A major	harpsichord	Telemann Portal; Catalogue TWV
TWV 34	50 Menuets (Second Series)	TWV 34:55	Menuet	A minor	harpsichord	Telemann Portal; Catalogue TWV
TWV 34	50 Menuets (Second Series)	TWV 34:56	Menuet	A minor	harpsichord	Telemann Portal; Catalogue TWV
TWV 34	50 Menuets (Second Series)	TWV 34:57	Menuet	A minor	harpsichord	Telemann Portal; Catalogue TWV
TWV 34	50 Menuets (Second Series)	TWV 34:58	Menuet	B♭ major	harpsichord	Telemann Portal; Catalogue TWV
TWV 34	50 Menuets (Second Series)	TWV 34:59	Menuet	B♭ major	harpsichord	Telemann Portal; Catalogue TWV
TWV 34	50 Menuets (Second Series)	TWV 34:60	Menuet	B♭ major	harpsichord	Telemann Portal; Catalogue TWV
TWV 34	50 Menuets (Second Series)	TWV 34:61	Menuet	B♭ major	harpsichord	Telemann Portal; Catalogue TWV
TWV 34	50 Menuets (Second Series)	TWV 34:62	Menuet	B minor	harpsichord	Telemann Portal; Catalogue TWV
TWV 34	50 Menuets (Second Series)	TWV 34:63	Menuet	B minor	harpsichord	Telemann Portal; Catalogue TWV
TWV 34	50 Menuets (Second Series)	TWV 34:64	Menuet	B minor	harpsichord	Telemann Portal; Catalogue TWV
TWV 34	50 Menuets (Second Series)	TWV 34:65	Menuet	C major	harpsichord	Telemann Portal; Catalogue TWV
TWV 34	50 Menuets (Second Series)	TWV 34:66	Menuet	C major	harpsichord	Telemann Portal; Catalogue TWV
TWV 34	50 Menuets (Second Series)	TWV 34:67	Menuet	C major	harpsichord	Telemann Portal; Catalogue TWV
TWV 34	50 Menuets (Second Series)	TWV 34:68	Menuet	C major	harpsichord	Telemann Portal; Catalogue TWV
TWV 34	50 Menuets (Second Series)	TWV 34:69	Menuet	C minor	harpsichord	Telemann Portal; Catalogue TWV
TWV 34	50 Menuets (Second Series)	TWV 34:70	Menuet	C minor	harpsichord	Telemann Portal; Catalogue TWV
TWV 34	50 Menuets (Second Series)	TWV 34:71	Menuet	C minor	harpsichord	Telemann Portal; Catalogue TWV
TWV 34	50 Menuets (Second Series)	TWV 34:72	Menuet	D major	harpsichord	Telemann Portal; Catalogue TWV
TWV 34	50 Menuets (Second Series)	TWV 34:73	Menuet	D major	harpsichord	Telemann Portal; Catalogue TWV
TWV 34	50 Menuets (Second Series)	TWV 34:74	Menuet	D major	harpsichord	Telemann Portal; Catalogue TWV
TWV 34	50 Menuets (Second Series)	TWV 34:75	Menuet	D major	harpsichord	Telemann Portal; Catalogue TWV
TWV 34	50 Menuets (Second Series)	TWV 34:76	Menuet	D minor	harpsichord	Telemann Portal; Catalogue TWV
TWV 34	50 Menuets (Second Series)	TWV 34:77	Menuet	D minor	harpsichord	Telemann Portal; Catalogue TWV
TWV 34	50 Menuets (Second Series)	TWV 34:78	Menuet	D minor	harpsichord	Telemann Portal; Catalogue TWV
TWV 34	50 Menuets (Second Series)	TWV 34:79	Menuet	E major	harpsichord	Telemann Portal; Catalogue TWV
TWV 34	50 Menuets (Second Series)	TWV 34:80	Menuet	E major	harpsichord	Telemann Portal; Catalogue TWV
TWV 34	50 Menuets (Second Series)	TWV 34:81	Menuet	E major	harpsichord	Telemann Portal; Catalogue TWV
TWV 34	50 Menuets (Second Series)	TWV 34:82	Menuet	E major	harpsichord	Telemann Portal; Catalogue TWV
TWV 34	50 Menuets (Second Series)	TWV 34:83	Menuet	E minor	harpsichord	Telemann Portal; Catalogue TWV
TWV 34	50 Menuets (Second Series)	TWV 34:84	Menuet	E minor	harpsichord	Telemann Portal; Catalogue TWV
TWV 34	50 Menuets (Second Series)	TWV 34:85	Menuet	E minor	harpsichord	Telemann Portal; Catalogue TWV
TWV 34	50 Menuets (Second Series)	TWV 34:86	Menuet	F major	harpsichord	Telemann Portal; Catalogue TWV
TWV 34	50 Menuets (Second Series)	TWV 34:87	Menuet	F major	harpsichord	Telemann Portal; Catalogue TWV
TWV 34	50 Menuets (Second Series)	TWV 34:88	Menuet	F major	harpsichord	Telemann Portal; Catalogue TWV
TWV 34	50 Menuets (Second Series)	TWV 34:89	Menuet	F major	harpsichord	Telemann Portal; Catalogue TWV
TWV 34	50 Menuets (Second Series)	TWV 34:90	Menuet	F♯ minor	harpsichord	Telemann Portal; Catalogue TWV
TWV 34	50 Menuets (Second Series)	TWV 34:91	Menuet	A major	harpsichord	Telemann Portal; Catalogue TWV
TWV 34	50 Menuets (Second Series)	TWV 34:92	Menuet	F♯ minor	harpsichord	Telemann Portal; Catalogue TWV
TWV 34	50 Menuets (Second Series)	TWV 34:93	Menuet	G major	harpsichord	Telemann Portal; Catalogue TWV
TWV 34	50 Menuets (Second Series)	TWV 34:94	Menuet	G major	harpsichord	Telemann Portal; Catalogue TWV
TWV 34	50 Menuets (Second Series)	TWV 34:95	Menuet	G major	harpsichord	Telemann Portal; Catalogue TWV
TWV 34	50 Menuets (Second Series)	TWV 34:96	Menuet	G major	harpsichord	Telemann Portal; Catalogue TWV
TWV 34	50 Menuets (Second Series)	TWV 34:97	Menuet	G minor	harpsichord	Telemann Portal; Catalogue TWV
TWV 34	50 Menuets (Second Series)	TWV 34:98	Menuet	G minor	harpsichord	Telemann Portal; Catalogue TWV
TWV 34	50 Menuets (Second Series)	TWV 34:99	Menuet	G minor	harpsichord	Telemann Portal; Catalogue TWV
TWV 34	50 Menuets (Second Series)	TWV 34:100	Menuet	G major	harpsichord	Telemann Portal; Catalogue TWV

=== TWV 35 – Individual pieces for harpsichord ===
Section	Catalogue	Title	Key	Scoring	Movements	Observation	URL
TWV 35	TWV 35:1	Marche pour M. le capitaine Weber und Retraite	F major	harpsichord	1. Marche; 2. Retraite	—	Telemann Portal; Catalogue TWV
TWV 35	TWV 35:2	La poste	B♭ major	harpsichord	—	—	Telemann Portal; Catalogue TWV
TWV 35	TWV 35:3	Menuet	G major	harpsichord	—	—	Telemann Portal; Catalogue TWV
TWV 35	TWV 35:4	Amoroso	A major	harpsichord	—	—	Telemann Portal; Catalogue TWV
TWV 35	TWV 35:5	Gigue	D minor	harpsichord	—	—	Telemann Portal; Catalogue TWV
TWV 35	TWV 35:6	Menuet et Alternatif	D major	harpsichord	1. Menuet; 2. Alternatio	—	Telemann Portal; Catalogue TWV
TWV 35	TWV 35:7	Air en gavotte	F major	harpsichord	—	—	Telemann Portal; Catalogue TWV
TWV 35	TWV Anh. 35:1	Menuet	B♭ major	harpsichord	—	Menuet from Overture TWV 55:B1	Telemann Portal; Catalogue TWV
TWV 35	TWV Anh. 35:2	Passacaille	E minor	harpsichord	—	By J.V. Gorner	Catalogue TWV

=== TWV 36 – Collection of manuscripts ===
Section	Grouping	Catalogue	Title	Key	Observation	URL
TWV 36	Neue auserlesene Arien, Menueten und Märche	TWV 36:1	Ihr schonen, horet an	D major	Aria	Catalogue TWV
TWV 36	Neue auserlesene Arien, Menueten und Märche	TWV 36:2	Sollen nun die grunen Jahre	G major	Aria	Catalogue TWV
TWV 36	Neue auserlesene Arien, Menueten und Märche	TWV 36:3	Ihe Sternen, hort	A minor	Marqui	Catalogue TWV
TWV 36	Neue auserlesene Arien, Menueten und Märche	TWV 36:4	Flich hin	G major	Aria	Catalogue TWV
TWV 36	Neue auserlesene Arien, Menueten und Märche	TWV 36:5	Amor, Cupido, mein Freund	G major	Aria	Catalogue TWV
TWV 36	Neue auserlesene Arien, Menueten und Märche	TWV 36:6	Menuet	G major	—	Catalogue TWV
TWV 36	Neue auserlesene Arien, Menueten und Märche	TWV 36:7	Menuet	G major	Menuet from Overture TWV 55:B12	Catalogue TWV
TWV 36	Neue auserlesene Arien, Menueten und Märche	TWV 36:8	Leben ist ein Werck der Gotter	G major	Aria	Catalogue TWV
TWV 36	Neue auserlesene Arien, Menueten und Märche	TWV 36:9	Trage, schonste Schaferin	G major	Aria	Catalogue TWV
TWV 36	Neue auserlesene Arien, Menueten und Märche	TWV 36:10	Komm, ach komm, mein werthes Leben	G major	Aria	Catalogue TWV
TWV 36	Neue auserlesene Arien, Menueten und Märche	TWV 36:11	Obich gleich ein Schafer bin	C major	Aria	Catalogue TWV
TWV 36	Neue auserlesene Arien, Menueten und Märche	TWV 36:12	Stille Gedaken	G major	Aria	Catalogue TWV
TWV 36	Neue auserlesene Arien, Menueten und Märche	TWV 36:13	Neidet mich immerhin	D major	Menuet	Catalogue TWV
TWV 36	Neue auserlesene Arien, Menueten und Märche	TWV 36:14	Alles ist mir Einerley	G major	Allegro	Catalogue TWV
TWV 36	Neue auserlesene Arien, Menueten und Märche	TWV 36:15	Cupido, bleibe mir ja vom Liebe	G major	Aria	Catalogue TWV
TWV 36	Neue auserlesene Arien, Menueten und Märche	TWV 36:16	Zu guter Nacht, mein Licht	C major	Valet Aria	Catalogue TWV
TWV 36	Neue auserlesene Arien, Menueten und Märche	TWV 36:17	Menuet	D major	—	Catalogue TWV
TWV 36	Neue auserlesene Arien, Menueten und Märche	TWV 36:18	Unser Caplan	D major	Menuet	Catalogue TWV
TWV 36	Neue auserlesene Arien, Menueten und Märche	TWV 36:19	Liebe Nonne	F major	Lamento	Catalogue TWV
TWV 36	Neue auserlesene Arien, Menueten und Märche	TWV 36:20	Ihr Sorgen, verlasst die stillen Gedancken	D major	Menuet	Catalogue TWV
TWV 36	Neue auserlesene Arien, Menueten und Märche	TWV 36:21	Menuet	D major	—	Catalogue TWV
TWV 36	Neue auserlesene Arien, Menueten und Märche	TWV 36:22	Lass es gehn, wie est geht	D major	Menuet II from Overture TWV 55:E2	Catalogue TWV
TWV 36	Neue auserlesene Arien, Menueten und Märche	TWV 36:23	Ich muss gestehn	D major	Menuet	Catalogue TWV
TWV 36	Neue auserlesene Arien, Menueten und Märche	TWV 36:24	Meine Lust und Vergnugung	D major	Menuet	Catalogue TWV
TWV 36	Neue auserlesene Arien, Menueten und Märche	TWV 36:25	Vem der Himmel	G major	Menuet	Catalogue TWV
TWV 36	Neue auserlesene Arien, Menueten und Märche	TWV 36:26	Lasst mich gehen, ihr nichtigen Sorgen	G major	Menuet	Catalogue TWV
TWV 36	Neue auserlesene Arien, Menueten und Märche	TWV 36:27	Mein Herz, getrost	D minor	Menuet	Catalogue TWV
TWV 36	Neue auserlesene Arien, Menueten und Märche	TWV 36:28	Wenn mein Madgen	D major	Menuet	Catalogue TWV
TWV 36	Neue auserlesene Arien, Menueten und Märche	TWV 36:29	Tausend Vergnugung muss mit geschehn	D major	Menuet	Catalogue TWV
TWV 36	Neue auserlesene Arien, Menueten und Märche	TWV 36:30	Meine Losung heisst stille seyn	G major	Menuet from Overture,TWV 55:G3(7)	Catalogue TWV
TWV 36	Neue auserlesene Arien, Menueten und Märche	TWV 36:31	Menuet	G major	—	Catalogue TWV
TWV 36	Neue auserlesene Arien, Menueten und Märche	TWV 36:32	Sussee Vergnugen	G major	Menuet from Overture TWV 55:G3(3)	Catalogue TWV
TWV 36	Neue auserlesene Arien, Menueten und Märche	TWV 36:33	D'Anjou	G minor	Menuet	Catalogue TWV
TWV 36	Neue auserlesene Arien, Menueten und Märche	TWV 36:34	Gavotte	G major	—	Catalogue TWV
TWV 36	Neue auserlesene Arien, Menueten und Märche	TWV 36:35	Fleg nur, Cupido	D minor	Menuet	Catalogue TWV
TWV 36	Neue auserlesene Arien, Menueten und Märche	TWV 36:36	Ich hoffe was	D major	Menuet	Catalogue TWV
TWV 36	Neue auserlesene Arien, Menueten und Märche	TWV 36:37	Geliebter Trost	F major	Menuet	Catalogue TWV
TWV 36	Neue auserlesene Arien, Menueten und Märche	TWV 36:38	Ich liebe die Fregheit	C major	Loure	Catalogue TWV
TWV 36	Neue auserlesene Arien, Menueten und Märche	TWV 36:39	Menuet	C major	—	Catalogue TWV
TWV 36	Neue auserlesene Arien, Menueten und Märche	TWV 36:40	Menuet	D major	—	Catalogue TWV
TWV 36	Neue auserlesene Arien, Menueten und Märche	TWV 36:41	Menuet	F major	—	Catalogue TWV
TWV 36	Neue auserlesene Arien, Menueten und Märche	TWV 36:42	Was muss oft nicht	G major	Menuet	Catalogue TWV
TWV 36	Neue auserlesene Arien, Menueten und Märche	TWV 36:43	Aria	D minor	—	Catalogue TWV
TWV 36	Neue auserlesene Arien, Menueten und Märche	TWV 36:44	Marche	F major	—	Catalogue TWV
TWV 36	Neue auserlesene Arien, Menueten und Märche	TWV 36:45	Ach mein Vergnugen	D minor	Aria	Catalogue TWV
TWV 36	Neue auserlesene Arien, Menueten und Märche	TWV 36:46	Marche	A major	—	Catalogue TWV
TWV 36	Neue auserlesene Arien, Menueten und Märche	TWV 36:47	Marche	G major	—	Catalogue TWV
TWV 36	Neue auserlesene Arien, Menueten und Märche	TWV 36:48	Marche	D major	—	Catalogue TWV
TWV 36	Neue auserlesene Arien, Menueten und Märche	TWV 36:49	Polonaise	D major	Paysans from Partita in G minor for 2 lutes TWV 39:2; Harlequinade from Overture TWV 55:a7	Catalogue TWV
TWV 36	Neue auserlesene Arien, Menueten und Märche	TWV 36:50	Ich liebe negligent	G major	Aria	Catalogue TWV
TWV 36	Neue auserlesene Arien, Menueten und Märche	TWV 36:51	Menuet	F major	—	Catalogue TWV
TWV 36	Neue auserlesene Arien, Menueten und Märche	TWV 36:52	Zufrieden, mein Herz	F major	Aria	Catalogue TWV
TWV 36	Neue auserlesene Arien, Menueten und Märche	TWV 36:53	Menuet	F major	—	Catalogue TWV
TWV 36	Neue auserlesene Arien, Menueten und Märche	TWV 36:54	Menuet	F major	—	Catalogue TWV
TWV 36	Neue auserlesene Arien, Menueten und Märche	TWV 36:55	Menuet	D minor	—	Catalogue TWV
TWV 36	Neue auserlesene Arien, Menueten und Märche	TWV 36:56	Menuet	B♭ major	—	Catalogue TWV
TWV 36	Neue auserlesene Arien, Menueten und Märche	TWV 36:57	Menuet	C major	—	Catalogue TWV
TWV 36	Neue auserlesene Arien, Menueten und Märche	TWV 36:58	Gavotte	F major	Presto from the Sonata, TWV 41:F1	Catalogue TWV
TWV 36	Neue auserlesene Arien, Menueten und Märche	TWV 36:59	Menuet	B♭ major	—	Catalogue TWV
TWV 36	Neue auserlesene Arien, Menueten und Märche	TWV 36:60	Menuet	D minor	—	Catalogue TWV
TWV 36	Neue auserlesene Arien, Menueten und Märche	TWV 36:61	Ich bin vergnugt	C major	Menuet	Catalogue TWV
TWV 36	Neue auserlesene Arien, Menueten und Märche	TWV 36:62	Menuet	G major	—	Catalogue TWV
TWV 36	Neue auserlesene Arien, Menueten und Märche	TWV 36:63	Lamarie	F major	—	Catalogue TWV
TWV 36	Neue auserlesene Arien, Menueten und Märche	TWV 36:64	Die Blumen diener schonen Wangen	G major	Menuet	Catalogue TWV
TWV 36	Neue auserlesene Arien, Menueten und Märche	TWV 36:65	Menuet	D major	—	Catalogue TWV
TWV 36	Neue auserlesene Arien, Menueten und Märche	TWV 36:66	Menuet	D major	—	Catalogue TWV
TWV 36	Neue auserlesene Arien, Menueten und Märche	TWV 36:67	Aria	G major	—	Catalogue TWV
TWV 36	Neue auserlesene Arien, Menueten und Märche	TWV 36:68	Menuet	F major	Menuet, TWV 34:21	Catalogue TWV
TWV 36	Neue auserlesene Arien, Menueten und Märche	TWV 36:69	Nimm das Herz con mir hin	C major	Menuet	Catalogue TWV
TWV 36	Neue auserlesene Arien, Menueten und Märche	TWV 36:70	Menuet	C major	Menuet from Overture, TWV 55:A6	Catalogue TWV
TWV 36	Neue auserlesene Arien, Menueten und Märche	TWV 36:71	Menuet	F major	—	Catalogue TWV
TWV 36	Neue auserlesene Arien, Menueten und Märche	TWV 36:72	Menuet	F major	—	Catalogue TWV
TWV 36	Neue auserlesene Arien, Menueten und Märche	TWV 36:73	Soll ich mein Licht	D major	Menuet	Catalogue TWV
TWV 36	Neue auserlesene Arien, Menueten und Märche	TWV 36:74	Geliebter Aufenthalt	F major	Menuet	Catalogue TWV
TWV 36	Neue auserlesene Arien, Menueten und Märche	TWV 36:75	Menuet	G major	—	Catalogue TWV
TWV 36	Neue auserlesene Arien, Menueten und Märche	TWV 36:76	Menuet	B♭ major	—	Catalogue TWV
TWV 36	Neue auserlesene Arien, Menueten und Märche	TWV 36:77	Willstu, mein Leben	G major	Menuet III from Overture, TWV 55:G5	Catalogue TWV
TWV 36	Neue auserlesene Arien, Menueten und Märche	TWV 36:78	Willstu denn nun von mir scheiden	G major	Menuet	Catalogue TWV
TWV 36	Neue auserlesene Arien, Menueten und Märche	TWV 36:79	Menuet	C major	—	Catalogue TWV
TWV 36	Neue auserlesene Arien, Menueten und Märche	TWV 36:80	Aria	G major	—	Catalogue TWV
TWV 36	Neue auserlesene Arien, Menueten und Märche	TWV 36:81	Menuet	G major	Menuet I from Overture, TWV 55:D4	Catalogue TWV
TWV 36	Neue auserlesene Arien, Menueten und Märche	TWV 36:82	Menuet	D major	—	Catalogue TWV
TWV 36	Neue auserlesene Arien, Menueten und Märche	TWV 36:83	Menuet	C major	—	Catalogue TWV
TWV 36	Neue auserlesene Arien, Menueten und Märche	TWV 36:84	Menuet	C major	—	Catalogue TWV
TWV 36	Neue auserlesene Arien, Menueten und Märche	TWV 36:85	Menuet	C major	—	Catalogue TWV
TWV 36	Neue auserlesene Arien, Menueten und Märche	TWV 36:86	Menuet	F major	—	Catalogue TWV
TWV 36	Neue auserlesene Arien, Menueten und Märche	TWV 36:87	Menuet	F major	—	Catalogue TWV
TWV 36	Neue auserlesene Arien, Menueten und Märche	TWV 36:88	Menuet	D major	Menuet I from Overture, TWV 55:Is4	Catalogue TWV
TWV 36	Neue auserlesene Arien, Menueten und Märche	TWV 36:89	Menuet	G major	—	Catalogue TWV
TWV 36	Neue auserlesene Arien, Menueten und Märche	TWV 36:90	Ach was fur Martter	G major	Menuet	Catalogue TWV
TWV 36	Neue auserlesene Arien, Menueten und Märche	TWV 36:91	Menuet	G major	—	Catalogue TWV
TWV 36	Neue auserlesene Arien, Menueten und Märche	TWV 36:92	Menuet	A minor	—	Catalogue TWV
TWV 36	Neue auserlesene Arien, Menueten und Märche	TWV 36:93	Menuet	C major	—	Catalogue TWV
TWV 36	Neue auserlesene Arien, Menueten und Märche	TWV 36:94	Eilet, ihr Seuffzer	D major	Menuet	Catalogue TWV
TWV 36	Neue auserlesene Arien, Menueten und Märche	TWV 36:95	Nichts Vergungters ist zu finden	G major	Menuet	Catalogue TWV
TWV 36	Neue auserlesene Arien, Menueten und Märche	TWV 36:96	Ich muss euch meiden	G major	Menuet I from Overture, TWV 55:D21	Catalogue TWV
TWV 36	Neue auserlesene Arien, Menueten und Märche	TWV 36:97	Menuet	D major	—	Catalogue TWV
TWV 36	Neue auserlesene Arien, Menueten und Märche	TWV 36:98	Was ich vor Trautigkeit	C major	Menuet	Catalogue TWV
TWV 36	Neue auserlesene Arien, Menueten und Märche	TWV 36:99	Menuet	G major	—	Catalogue TWV
TWV 36	Neue auserlesene Arien, Menueten und Märche	TWV 36:100	Mein Engel, lass uns keimlich lieben	G minor	Aria	Catalogue TWV
TWV 36	Neue auserlesene Arien, Menueten und Märche	TWV 36:101	Menuet	G major	—	Catalogue TWV
TWV 36	Neue auserlesene Arien, Menueten und Märche	TWV 36:102	Menuet	A major	= TWV 35:6(2), Menuet II from Overture TWV 55:E(1)	Catalogue TWV
TWV 36	Neue auserlesene Arien, Menueten und Märche	TWV 36:103	Menuet	D major	—	Catalogue TWV
TWV 36	Neue auserlesene Arien, Menueten und Märche	TWV 36:104	Menuet	D major	—	Catalogue TWV
TWV 36	Neue auserlesene Arien, Menueten und Märche	TWV 36:105	Menuet	D major	—	Catalogue TWV
TWV 36	Neue auserlesene Arien, Menueten und Märche	TWV 36:106	Menuet	D major	—	Catalogue TWV
TWV 36	Neue auserlesene Arien, Menueten und Märche	TWV 36:107	Menuet	D major	—	Catalogue TWV
TWV 36	Neue auserlesene Arien, Menueten und Märche	TWV 36:108	Menuet	D major	—	Catalogue TWV
TWV 36	Neue auserlesene Arien, Menueten und Märche	TWV 36:109	Menuet	D major	—	Catalogue TWV
TWV 36	Neue auserlesene Arien, Menueten und Märche	TWV 36:110	Menuet	G major	Menuet I from Overture, TWV 55:D8	Catalogue TWV
TWV 36	Neue auserlesene Arien, Menueten und Märche	TWV 36:111	Lieben und verschwiegen seyn	G major	Menuet	Catalogue TWV
TWV 36	Neue auserlesene Arien, Menueten und Märche	TWV 36:112	Menuet	C major	—	Catalogue TWV
TWV 36	Neue auserlesene Arien, Menueten und Märche	TWV 36:113	Gute Nacht, mein Hertzens Madgen	C major	Aria	Catalogue TWV
TWV 36	Neue auserlesene Arien, Menueten und Märche	TWV 36:114	Ihr vergnugten Stunden	A minor	Aria	Catalogue TWV
TWV 36	Neue auserlesene Arien, Menueten und Märche	TWV 36:115	Mein angenehmes Licht	F major	Menuet	Catalogue TWV
TWV 36	Neue auserlesene Arien, Menueten und Märche	TWV 36:116	Mein madgen das ist recht galland	C major	Menuet	Catalogue TWV
TWV 36	Neue auserlesene Arien, Menueten und Märche	TWV 36:117	Bergonnt mir, ihr Schonen	D minor	Aria	Catalogue TWV
TWV 36	Neue auserlesene Arien, Menueten und Märche	TWV 36:118	Menuet	C major	—	Catalogue TWV
TWV 36	Neue auserlesene Arien, Menueten und Märche	TWV 36:119	Menuet	F major	—	Catalogue TWV
TWV 36	Neue auserlesene Arien, Menueten und Märche	TWV 36:120	Menuet	F major	—	Catalogue TWV
TWV 36	Neue auserlesene Arien, Menueten und Märche	TWV 36:121	Menuet	A minor	—	Catalogue TWV
TWV 36	Neue auserlesene Arien, Menueten und Märche	TWV 36:122	Menuet	G major	—	Catalogue TWV
TWV 36	Neue auserlesene Arien, Menueten und Märche	TWV 36:123	Menuet	D major	—	Catalogue TWV
TWV 36	Neue auserlesene Arien, Menueten und Märche	TWV 36:124	Menuet	D major	Menuet from Overture, TWV 55:D10	Catalogue TWV
TWV 36	Neue auserlesene Arien, Menueten und Märche	TWV 36:125	Menuet	D major	—	Catalogue TWV
TWV 36	Neue auserlesene Arien, Menueten und Märche	TWV 36:126	Marche	G major	—	Catalogue TWV
TWV 36	Neue auserlesene Arien, Menueten und Märche	TWV 36:127	Marche	C major	—	Catalogue TWV
TWV 36	Neue auserlesene Arien, Menueten und Märche	TWV 36:128	Menuet	G major	—	Catalogue TWV
TWV 36	Neue auserlesene Arien, Menueten und Märche	TWV 36:129	Menuet	F major	—	Catalogue TWV
TWV 36	Neue auserlesene Arien, Menueten und Märche	TWV 36:130	Menuet	B♭ major	—	Catalogue TWV
TWV 36	Neue auserlesene Arien, Menueten und Märche	TWV 36:131	Menuet	G major	—	Catalogue TWV
TWV 36	Neue auserlesene Arien, Menueten und Märche	TWV 36:132	Menuet	G major	—	Catalogue TWV
TWV 36	Neue auserlesene Arien, Menueten und Märche	TWV 36:133	Menuet	G major	—	Catalogue TWV
TWV 36	Neue auserlesene Arien, Menueten und Märche	TWV 36:134	Menuet	G major	—	Catalogue TWV
TWV 36	Neue auserlesene Arien, Menueten und Märche	TWV 36:135	Menuet	G major	—	Catalogue TWV
TWV 36	Neue auserlesene Arien, Menueten und Märche	TWV 36:136	Menuet	E minor	—	Catalogue TWV
TWV 36	Neue auserlesene Arien, Menueten und Märche	TWV 36:137	Menuet	G major	—	Catalogue TWV
TWV 36	Neue auserlesene Arien, Menueten und Märche	TWV 36:138	Menuet	E minor	—	Catalogue TWV
TWV 36	Neue auserlesene Arien, Menueten und Märche	TWV 36:139	Menuet	F major	—	Catalogue TWV
TWV 36	Neue auserlesene Arien, Menueten und Märche	TWV 36:140	Menuet	D major	—	Catalogue TWV
TWV 36	Neue auserlesene Arien, Menueten und Märche	TWV 36:141	Menuet	D major	—	Catalogue TWV
TWV 36	Neue auserlesene Arien, Menueten und Märche	TWV 36:142	So offt ich meine Tobacks Pfeiffe	D minor	Aria	Catalogue TWV
TWV 36	Neue auserlesene Arien, Menueten und Märche	TWV 36:143	Schonster Herr Brautigam	D minor	Menuet	Catalogue TWV
TWV 36	Neue auserlesene Arien, Menueten und Märche	TWV 36:144	Menuet	G major	Menuet II from Overture, TWV 55:e3	Catalogue TWV
TWV 36	Neue auserlesene Arien, Menueten und Märche	TWV 36:145	Menuet	G major	—	Catalogue TWV
TWV 36	Neue auserlesene Arien, Menueten und Märche	TWV 36:146	Menuet	G major	—	Catalogue TWV
TWV 36	Neue auserlesene Arien, Menueten und Märche	TWV 36:147	Menuet	G major	—	Catalogue TWV
TWV 36	Neue auserlesene Arien, Menueten und Märche	TWV 36:148	Menuet	G major	—	Catalogue TWV
TWV 36	Neue auserlesene Arien, Menueten und Märche	TWV 36:149	Menuet	F major	—	Catalogue TWV
TWV 36	Neue auserlesene Arien, Menueten und Märche	TWV 36:150	Menuet	D major	—	Catalogue TWV
TWV 36	Neue auserlesene Arien, Menueten und Märche	TWV 36:151	Menuet	D major	—	Catalogue TWV
TWV 36	Neue auserlesene Arien, Menueten und Märche	TWV 36:152	Menuet	D major	—	Catalogue TWV
TWV 36	Neue auserlesene Arien, Menueten und Märche	TWV 36:153	Menuet	D major	—	Catalogue TWV
TWV 36	Neue auserlesene Arien, Menueten und Märche	TWV 36:154	Menuet	D minor	—	Catalogue TWV
TWV 36	Neue auserlesene Arien, Menueten und Märche	TWV 36:155	Menuet	D major	—	Catalogue TWV
TWV 36	Neue auserlesene Arien, Menueten und Märche	TWV 36:156	Menuet	G major	—	Catalogue TWV
TWV 36	Neue auserlesene Arien, Menueten und Märche	TWV 36:157	Menuet	B♭ major	—	Catalogue TWV
TWV 36	Neue auserlesene Arien, Menueten und Märche	TWV 36:158	Menuet	G minor	Menuet TWV 34:55	Catalogue TWV
TWV 36	Neue auserlesene Arien, Menueten und Märche	TWV 36:159	Menuet	D major	—	Catalogue TWV
TWV 36	Neue auserlesene Arien, Menueten und Märche	TWV 36:160	Menuet	D major	—	Catalogue TWV
TWV 36	Neue auserlesene Arien, Menueten und Märche	TWV 36:161	Menuet	D minor	—	Catalogue TWV
TWV 36	Neue auserlesene Arien, Menueten und Märche	TWV 36:162	Menuet	F major	—	Catalogue TWV
TWV 36	Neue auserlesene Arien, Menueten und Märche	TWV 36:163	Menuet	F major	—	Catalogue TWV
TWV 36	Neue auserlesene Arien, Menueten und Märche	TWV 36:164	Menuet	G major	—	Catalogue TWV
TWV 36	Neue auserlesene Arien, Menueten und Märche	TWV 36:165	Dem Gartner muss das Hertze lachen	G major	Menuet	Catalogue TWV
TWV 36	Neue auserlesene Arien, Menueten und Märche	TWV 36:166	Liebstes Kind, ich bin dir gut	B♭ major	Menuet	Catalogue TWV
TWV 36	Neue auserlesene Arien, Menueten und Märche	TWV 36:167	Marche	D major	—	Catalogue TWV
TWV 36	Neue auserlesene Arien, Menueten und Märche	TWV 36:168	Marche	D major	—	Catalogue TWV

=== TWV 37 – Lustiger Mischmasch ===
Section	Catalogue	Title	URL
TWV 37	TWV 37	Lustiger Mischmasch	

=== TWV 39 – Works for lute ===
Section	Catalogue	Title	Key	Scoring	Movements	URL
TWV 39	TWV 39:1	Partie polonaise	B♭ major	2 lutes	1. Ouverture; 2. Harlequinade; 3. Le Ris; 4. Rigidon; 5. Combattans; 6. Hanaque; 7. Sarrois; 8. Gigue	Telemann Portal; Catalogue TWV
TWV 39	TWV 39:2	Partie	G minor	2 lutes	1. Ouverture; 2. Effronterie; 4. Rigidon; 5. Menuet; 6. Trio (G major); 7. Paysans (G major); 8. Anglaise	Telemann Portal; Catalogue TWV

=== TWV 40 – Chamber music without basso continuo ===
Section	Grouping	Catalogue	Title	Key	Scoring	Movements	Observation	URL
TWV 40	—	TWV 40:1	Sonata	D major	viola da gamba	1. Andante; 2. Vivace; 3. Recitativo (B minor) / Andante arioso (B minor); 4. Vivace	—	Telemann Portal; Catalogue TWV
TWV 40	12 Fantasias for Solo Flute	TWV 40:2	Fantasia	A major	flute	1. Vivace; 2. Allegro	—	Telemann Portal; Catalogue TWV
TWV 40	12 Fantasias for Solo Flute	TWV 40:3	Fantasia	A minor	flute	1. Grave; 2. Vivace; 3. Adagio (C major); 4. Allegro	—	Telemann Portal; Catalogue TWV
TWV 40	12 Fantasias for Solo Flute	TWV 40:4	Fantasia	B minor	flute	1. Largo / Vivace; 2. Allegro	—	Telemann Portal; Catalogue TWV
TWV 40	12 Fantasias for Solo Flute	TWV 40:5	Fantasia	B♭ major	flute	1. Andante; 2. Allegro; 3. Presto	—	Telemann Portal; Catalogue TWV
TWV 40	12 Fantasias for Solo Flute	TWV 40:6	Fantasia	C major	flute	1. Presto / Largo; 2. Allegro; 3. Allegro	—	Telemann Portal; Catalogue TWV
TWV 40	12 Fantasias for Solo Flute	TWV 40:7	Fantasia	D minor	flute	1. Dolce; 2. Allegro; 3. Spirituoso	—	Telemann Portal; Catalogue TWV
TWV 40	12 Fantasias for Solo Flute	TWV 40:8	Fantasia	D major	flute	1. Alla francese 2. Presto	—	Telemann Portal; Catalogue TWV
TWV 40	12 Fantasias for Solo Flute	TWV 40:9	Fantasia	E minor	flute	1. Largo; 2. Spirituoso; 3. Allegro	—	Telemann Portal; Catalogue TWV
TWV 40	12 Fantasias for Solo Flute	TWV 40:10	Fantasia	E major	flute	1. Affettuoso; 2. Allegro; 3. Grave (C♯ minor); 4. Vivace	—	Telemann Portal; Catalogue TWV
TWV 40	12 Fantasias for Solo Flute	TWV 40:11	Fantasia	F♯ minor	flute	1. A tempo giusto 2. Presto; 3. Moderato	—	Telemann Portal; Catalogue TWV
TWV 40	12 Fantasias for Solo Flute	TWV 40:12	Fantasia	G major	flute	1. Allegro; 2. Adagio (E minor) / Vivace; 3. Allegro	—	Telemann Portal; Catalogue TWV
TWV 40	12 Fantasias for Solo Flute	TWV 40:13	Fantasia	G minor	flute	1. Grave / Allegro; 2. Dolce / Allegro (B♭ major); 3. Presto	—	Telemann Portal; Catalogue TWV
TWV 40	12 Fantasias for Solo Violin	TWV 40:14	Fantasia	B♭ major	violin	1. Largo; 2. Allegro; 3. Grave; 4. Si replica l'allegro	—	Telemann Portal; Catalogue TWV
TWV 40	12 Fantasias for Solo Violin	TWV 40:15	Fantasia	G major	violin	1. Largo; 2. Allegro; 3. Allegro	—	Telemann Portal; Catalogue TWV
TWV 40	12 Fantasias for Solo Violin	TWV 40:16	Fantasia	F minor	violin	1. Adagio; 2. Presto; 3. Grave (C minor); 4. Vivace	—	Telemann Portal; Catalogue TWV
TWV 40	12 Fantasias for Solo Violin	TWV 40:17	Fantasia	D major	violin	1. Vivace; 2. Grave (B minor) / Allegro	—	Telemann Portal; Catalogue TWV
TWV 40	12 Fantasias for Solo Violin	TWV 40:18	Fantasia	A major	violin	1. Allegro / Presto; 2. Andante (F♯ minor); 3. Allegro	—	Telemann Portal; Catalogue TWV
TWV 40	12 Fantasias for Solo Violin	TWV 40:19	Fantasia	E minor	violin	1. Grave; 2. Presto; 3. Siciliana (G major); 4. Allegro (E minor / E major / E minor)	—	Telemann Portal; Catalogue TWV
TWV 40	12 Fantasias for Solo Violin	TWV 40:20	Fantasia	E♭ major	violin	1. Dolce; 2. Allegro; 3. Largo (C minor); 4. Presto	—	Telemann Portal; Catalogue TWV
TWV 40	12 Fantasias for Solo Violin	TWV 40:21	Fantasia	E major	violin	1. Piacevolmente; 2. Spirituoso; 3. Allegro	—	Telemann Portal; Catalogue TWV
TWV 40	12 Fantasias for Solo Violin	TWV 40:22	Fantasia	B minor	violin	1. Siciliana; 2. Vivace; 3. Allegro	—	Telemann Portal; Catalogue TWV
TWV 40	12 Fantasias for Solo Violin	TWV 40:23	Fantasia	D major	violin	1. Presto; 2. Largo (B minor); 3. Allegro	—	Telemann Portal; Catalogue TWV
TWV 40	12 Fantasias for Solo Violin	TWV 40:24	Fantasia	F major	violin	1. Un poco vivace 2. Soave (G minor); 3. Allegro	—	Telemann Portal; Catalogue TWV
TWV 40	12 Fantasias for Solo Violin	TWV 40:25	Fantasia	A minor	violin	1. Moderato; 2. Vivace; 3. Presto (A major)	—	Telemann Portal; Catalogue TWV
TWV 40	12 Fantasias for Viola da Gamba	TWV 40:26	Fantasia	C minor	—	1. Adagio; 2. Allegro; 3. Adagio; 4. Allegro	—	Telemann Portal; Catalogue TWV
TWV 40	12 Fantasias for Viola da Gamba	TWV 40:27	Fantasia	D major	—	1. Vivace; 2. Andante; 3. Vivace Presto	—	Telemann Portal; Catalogue TWV
TWV 40	12 Fantasias for Viola da Gamba	TWV 40:28	Fantasia	E minor	—	1. Largo; 2. Presto; 3. Vivace	—	Telemann Portal; Catalogue TWV
TWV 40	12 Fantasias for Viola da Gamba	TWV 40:29	Fantasia	F major	—	1. Vivace; 2. Grave; 3. Allegro	—	Telemann Portal; Catalogue TWV
TWV 40	12 Fantasias for Viola da Gamba	TWV 40:30	Fantasia	B♭ major	—	1. Allegro; 2. Largo; 3. Allegro	—	Telemann Portal; Catalogue TWV
TWV 40	12 Fantasias for Viola da Gamba	TWV 40:31	Fantasia	G major	—	1. Scherzando; 2. Dolce; 3. Spirituoso	—	Telemann Portal; Catalogue TWV
TWV 40	12 Fantasias for Viola da Gamba	TWV 40:32	Fantasia	G minor	—	1. Andante; 2. Vivace; 3. Allegro	—	Telemann Portal; Catalogue TWV
TWV 40	12 Fantasias for Viola da Gamba	TWV 40:33	Fantasia	A major	—	1. Allegro; 2. Vivace; 3. Allegro	—	Telemann Portal; Catalogue TWV
TWV 40	12 Fantasias for Viola da Gamba	TWV 40:34	Fantasia	C major	—	1. Presto; 2. Grave; 3. Allegro	—	Telemann Portal; Catalogue TWV
TWV 40	12 Fantasias for Viola da Gamba	TWV 40:35	Fantasia	E major	—	1. Dolce; 2. Allegro; 3. Dolce; 4. Allegro	—	Telemann Portal; Catalogue TWV
TWV 40	12 Fantasias for Viola da Gamba	TWV 40:36	Fantasia	D minor	—	1. Allegro; 2. Grave; 3. Allegro	—	Telemann Portal; Catalogue TWV
TWV 40	12 Fantasias for Viola da Gamba	TWV 40:37	Fantasia	E♭ major	—	1. Andante; 2. Allegro; 3. Vivace	—	Telemann Portal; Catalogue TWV
TWV 40	6 Sonatas for Two Flutes or Violins	TWV 40:101	Sonata	G major	2 flutes/violins	1. Soave; 2. Allegro; 3. Andante (E minor); 4. Allegro	—	Telemann Portal; Catalogue TWV
TWV 40	6 Sonatas for Two Flutes or Violins	TWV 40:102	Sonata	D major	2 flutes/violins	1. Dolce; 2. Allegro; 3. Largo (B minor); 4. Vivace	—	Telemann Portal; Catalogue TWV
TWV 40	6 Sonatas for Two Flutes or Violins	TWV 40:103	Sonata	A major	2 flutes/violins	1. Siciliano; 2. Vivace; 3. Andante (F♯ minor); 4. Allegro	—	Telemann Portal; Catalogue TWV
TWV 40	6 Sonatas for Two Flutes or Violins	TWV 40:104	Sonata	E minor	2 flutes/violins	1. Largo; 2. Allegro; 3. Affettuoso (G major); 4. Vivace	—	Telemann Portal; Catalogue TWV
TWV 40	6 Sonatas for Two Flutes or Violins	TWV 40:105	Sonata	B minor	2 flutes/violins	1. Largo; 2. Vivace; 3. Gratioso (D major); 4. Allegro	—	Telemann Portal; Catalogue TWV
TWV 40	6 Sonatas for Two Flutes or Violins	TWV 40:106	Sonata	E major	2 flutes/violins	1. Affettuoso; 2. Presto; 3. Soave (C♯ minor); 4. Spirituoso	—	Telemann Portal; Catalogue TWV
TWV 40	—	TWV 40:107	Sonata	B♭ major	2 recorders / in G major, for 2 flutes / in A major for 2 bass viols	1. Affettuoso; 2. Allegro; 3. Andante (G minor); 4. Presto	—	Telemann Portal; Catalogue TWV
TWV 40	—	TWV 40:108	Suite	D major	2 violins	1. Intrada. Spirituoso; 2. Lilliputsche. Chaconne; 3. Brobdingnagische. Gigue; 4. Reverie der Laputier, nebst ihren Aufweckern. Andante; 5. Loure der gesitteten Houhnhnms / Furie der unartigen Yahoos	# 24 from Der getreue Music-Meister	Telemann Portal; Catalogue TWV
TWV 40	—	TWV 40:109	Carillon	F major	2 chalumeaux / recorder and chalumeau / flute and chalumeau	—	# 26 from Der getreue Music-Meister	Telemann Portal; Catalogue TWV
TWV 40	—	TWV 40:110	Menuet	C major	2 horns	—	# 27 from Der getreue Music-Meister	Telemann Portal; Catalogue TWV
TWV 40	—	TWV 40:111	Sonata	B♭ major	Recorder and violin / in G major, for flute and viola pomposa or violin / in A major, for 2 bass viol	1. Dolce; 2. Scherzando; 3. Largo e misurato (G minor); 4. Vivace e staccato	# 59 from Der getreue Music-Meister	Telemann Portal; Catalogue TWV
TWV 40	6 Canonical Sonatas	TWV 40:118	Sonata	G major	2 recorders / 2 violins / 2 bass viols	1. Vivace; 2. Adagio (E minor); 3. Allegro	—	Telemann Portal; Catalogue TWV
TWV 40	6 Canonical Sonatas	TWV 40:119	Sonata	G minor	2 recorders / 2 violins / 2 bass viols	1. Presto; 2. Largo (B♭ major); 3. Vivace	—	Telemann Portal; Catalogue TWV
TWV 40	6 Canonical Sonatas	TWV 40:120	Sonata	D major	2 recorders / 2 violins / 2 bass viols	1. Spirituoso; 2. Larghetto (B minor); 3. Allegro assai	—	Telemann Portal; Catalogue TWV
TWV 40	6 Canonical Sonatas	TWV 40:121	Sonata	D minor	2 recorders / 2 violins / 2 bass viols	1. Vivace, ma moderato 2. Piacevole, non largo (G minor); 3. Presto	—	Telemann Portal; Catalogue TWV
TWV 40	6 Canonical Sonatas	TWV 40:122	Sonata	A major	2 recorders / 2 violins / 2 bass viols	1. Vivace; 2. Cantabile (B minor); 3. Scherzando	—	Telemann Portal; Catalogue TWV
TWV 40	6 Canonical Sonatas	TWV 40:123	Sonata	A minor	2 recorders / 2 violins / 2 bass viols	1. Vivace; 2. Soave (B♭ major); 3. Allegro assai	—	Telemann Portal; Catalogue TWV
TWV 40	Second livre de duo pour deux violons, fluttes ou hautbois	TWV 40:124	Sonata	G major	2 flutes / 2 violins / 2 oboes	1. Vivace; 2. Andantino (G minor); 3. Spirituoso	—	Telemann Portal; Catalogue TWV
TWV 40	Second livre de duo pour deux violons, fluttes ou hautbois	TWV 40:125	Sonata	A minor	2 flutes / 2 violins / 2 oboes	1. Vivace; 2. Moderato (C major); 3. Allegro	—	Telemann Portal; Catalogue TWV
TWV 40	Second livre de duo pour deux violons, fluttes ou hautbois	TWV 40:126	Sonata	B minor	2 flutes / 2 violins / 2 oboes	1. Vivace; 2. Poco presto (D major); 3. Allegro	—	Telemann Portal; Catalogue TWV
TWV 40	Second livre de duo pour deux violons, fluttes ou hautbois	TWV 40:127	Sonata	E minor	2 flutes / 2 violins / 2 oboes	1. Allegro; 2. Andante (G major); 3. Vivace	—	Telemann Portal; Catalogue TWV
TWV 40	Second livre de duo pour deux violons, fluttes ou hautbois	TWV 40:128	Sonata	A major	2 flutes / 2 violins / 2 oboes	1. Allegro; 2. Allegremente (D minor); 3. Poco presto	—	Telemann Portal; Catalogue TWV
TWV 40	Second livre de duo pour deux violons, fluttes ou hautbois	TWV 40:129	Sonata	E major	2 flutes / 2 violins / 2 oboes	1. Presto; 2. Aria. Allegretto (E minor); 3. Vivace assai	—	Telemann Portal; Catalogue TWV
TWV 40	Sei Duetti per due Flauti	TWV 40:130	Duet	B♭ major	2 flutes	1. Moderato; 2. Presto; 3. Dolce (C minor); 4. Allegro	—	Telemann Portal; Catalogue TWV
TWV 40	Sei Duetti per due Flauti	TWV 40:131	Duet	C minor	2 flutes	1. Grave; 2. Allegretto; 3. Larghetto (F minor); 4. Vivace	—	Telemann Portal; Catalogue TWV
TWV 40	Sei Duetti per due Flauti	TWV 40:132	Duet	C minor	2 flutes	1. Grave; 2. Allegro (E♭ major); 3. Dolce (C major); 4. Vivace (E♭ major)	—	Telemann Portal; Catalogue TWV
TWV 40	Sei Duetti per due Flauti	TWV 40:133	Duet	F minor	2 flutes	1. Adagio; 2. Allegro; 3. Larghetto (F major); 4. Presto	—	Telemann Portal; Catalogue TWV
TWV 40	Sei Duetti per due Flauti	TWV 40:134	Duet	B♭ major	2 flutes	1. Moderato; 2. Presto; 3. Amoroso (F minor); 4. No title	—	Telemann Portal; Catalogue TWV
TWV 40	Sei Duetti per due Flauti	TWV 40:135	Duet	E major	2 flutes	1. Andante con affetto 3. Vivace; 3. Amoroso (A minor); 4. Presto	—	Telemann Portal; Catalogue TWV
TWV 40	—	TWV 40:136	Duet	—	—	—	—	Telemann Portal; Catalogue TWV
TWV 40	—	TWV 40:137	Duet	B minor	—	1. Largo; 2. Vivace; 3. Lento; 4. Presto	—	Telemann Portal; Catalogue TWV
TWV 40	—	TWV 40:138	Presto	A major	2 flutes	—	—	Telemann Portal; Catalogue TWV
TWV 40	—	TWV 40:139	Allegro	A major	—	—	—	Telemann Portal; Catalogue TWV
TWV 40	—	TWV 40:140	Piacevole	E minor	—	—	—	Telemann Portal; Catalogue TWV
TWV 40	—	TWV 40:141	Sonata	B minor	2 flutes and basso continuo	—	—	Telemann Portal; Catalogue TWV
TWV 40	—	TWV 40:142	Sonata	E minor	2 flutes and basso continuo	—	—	Telemann Portal; Catalogue TWV
TWV 40	—	TWV 40:143	Sonata	G major	2 flutes and basso continuo	—	—	Telemann Portal; Catalogue TWV
TWV 40	—	TWV 40:144	Sonata	A major	2 flutes and basso continuo	—	—	Telemann Portal; Catalogue TWV
TWV 40	—	TWV 40:145	Sonata	G major	2 flutes and basso continuo	—	—	Telemann Portal; Catalogue TWV
TWV 40	—	TWV 40:146	Sonata	E minor	2 flutes and basso continuo	—	—	Telemann Portal; Catalogue TWV
TWV 40	—	TWV 40:147	Sonata	B minor	2 flutes and basso continuo	—	—	Telemann Portal; Catalogue TWV
TWV 40	—	TWV 40:148	Sonata	G major	2 flutes and basso continuo	—	—	Telemann Portal; Catalogue TWV
TWV 40	—	TWV 40:149	Sonata	D major	2 flutes and basso continuo	—	—	Telemann Portal; Catalogue TWV
TWV 40	—	TWV 40:150	Sonata	D major	3 instruments without basso continuo	1. Dolce; 2. Vivace; 3. Largo (B minor); 4. Allegro	—	Telemann Portal; Catalogue TWV
TWV 40	—	TWV 40:151	Sonata	E minor	3 instruments without basso continuo	1. Largo; 2. Allegro; 3. Soave (G major); 4. Presto	—	Telemann Portal; Catalogue TWV
TWV 40	—	TWV 40:152	Sonata	B minor	3 instruments without basso continuo	1. Preludio. Largo; 2. Aria I 3. Aria II (D major); 4. Aria III. Vivace poco 5. Aria IV. Presto	—	Telemann Portal; Catalogue TWV
TWV 40	—	TWV 40:200	Quartet	A major	2 violins, viola and cello	1. Affettuoso; 2. Allegro; 3. Vivace	—	Telemann Portal; Catalogue TWV
TWV 40	Concertos for Four Violins	TWV 40:201	Concerto	G major	4 violins	1. Largo e staccato 2. Allegro; 3. Adagio (E minor); 4. Vivace	—	Telemann Portal; Catalogue TWV
TWV 40	Concertos for Four Violins	TWV 40:202	Concerto	D major	4 violins	1. Adagio; 2. Allegro; 3. Grave (B minor); 4. Allegro	—	Telemann Portal; Catalogue TWV
TWV 40	Concertos for Four Violins	TWV 40:203	Concerto	C major	4 violins	1. Grave; 2. Allegro; 3. Largo e staccato (A minor); 4. Allegro	—	Telemann Portal; Catalogue TWV
TWV 40	Concertos for Four Violins	TWV 40:204	Concerto	A major	4 violins	1. Grave; 2. Allegro; 3. Adagio (F♯ minor); 4. Spirituoso	—	Telemann Portal; Catalogue TWV
TWV 40	—	TWV Anh. 40:101	Sonata	E minor	2 recorders	—	Trio sonata TWV 42:e13	Telemann Portal; Catalogue TWV
TWV 40	—	TWV Anh. 40:102	Sonata	F♯ minor	2 recorders	—	Trio sonata TWV 42:fis1	Telemann Portal; Catalogue TWV
TWV 40	—	TWV Anh. 40:103	Zirkelkanon	E minor	2 recorders / 2 violins	1. Canone infinito. Piu tosto vivace	—	Telemann Portal; Catalogue TWV
TWV 40	—	TWV Anh. 40:104	Bergerie	G major	flute and oboe	1. Bergerie; 2. Bourrée	—	Catalogue TWV

=== TWV 41 – Chamber music for 1 instrument with basso continuo ===
Section	Catalogue	Title	Key	Scoring	Movements	Observation	URL
TWV 41	TWV 41:A1	Sonata	A major	violin and basso continuo	1. Allemanda. Largo; 2. Corrente. Allegro; 3. Sarabanda; 4. Giga	# 6 from 6 Sonates à Violon Seul, accompagné par le Clavessin	Telemann Portal; Catalogue TWV
TWV 41	TWV 41:A2	Sonatina	A major	violin and basso continuo	1. Adagio; 2. Allegro assai 3. Largo (F♯ minor); 4. Allegro	# 1 from Suonatine per Violino e Cembalo	Telemann Portal; Catalogue TWV
TWV 41	TWV 41:A3	Sonata	A major	Violin / Flute and Basso Continuo	1. Adagio; 2. Vivace; 3. Cortesemente; 4. Vivace	# 2 from Sonate metodiche a Violino solo o Flauto traverso	Telemann Portal; Catalogue TWV
TWV 41	TWV 41:A4	Sonata	A major	violin and basso continuo	1. Andante; 2. Vivace; 3. Cantabile (F♯ minor); 4. Allegro	# 5 from Musique de table II	Telemann Portal; Catalogue TWV
TWV 41	TWV 41:A5	Sonata	A major	Violin / Flute and Basso Continuo	1. Largo; 2. Allegro; 3. Andante semplicemente (F♯ minor); 4. Vivace	# 3 from 12 Solos à Violon ou Traversière avec la basse chiffrée	Telemann Portal; Catalogue TWV
TWV 41	TWV 41:A6	Sonata	A major	violin and basso continuo	1. Dolce; 2. Allegro; 3. Grave (F♯ minor); 4. Allegro	# 13 from Essercizii Musici overo Dodeci Soli e Dodeci Trii à diversi stromenti	Telemann Portal; Catalogue TWV
TWV 41	TWV 41:A7	Sonata	A major	violin and basso continuo	1. Adagio; 2. Allegro; 3. No title (F♯ minor); 4. Vivace	—	Telemann Portal; Catalogue TWV
TWV 41	TWV 41:A8	Sonata	A major	violin and basso continuo	1. Adagio; 2. Courent; 3. Allemand; 4. Gigue	# 13 from 16 Sonaten à Violino e Continuo	Telemann Portal; Catalogue TWV
TWV 41	TWV 41:A9	Sonata	A major	violin and basso continuo	1. No title 2. Courrente; 3. Sarabande; 4. Gigue; 5. No title	# 16 from 16 Sonaten à Violino e Continuo	Telemann Portal; Catalogue TWV
TWV 41	TWV 41:B1	Partita	B♭ major	violin / flute / oboe and basso continuo	1. Con Affetto; 2. Aria I. Presto; 3. Aria II. Dolce; 4. Aria III. Vivace; 5. Aria IV. Largo; 6. Aria V. No title 7. Aria VI. Allegro	# 1 from Kleine Camer-Music	Telemann Portal; Catalogue TWV
TWV 41	TWV 41:B2	Sonatina	B♭ major	violin and basso continuo	1. Dolce; 2. Allegro; 3. Affettuoso; 4. Presto	# 2 from Suonatine per Violino e Cembalo	Telemann Portal; Catalogue TWV
TWV 41	TWV 41:B3	Sonata	B♭ major	viola / viola da gamba and basso continuo or alto and viola recorder / viola da gamba without basso continuo or in A major for flute / violin and viola / viola da gamba without basso continuo	1. Largo; 2. Allegro; 3. Largo (G minor); 4. Vivace	# 28 from Der getreue Music-Meister	Telemann Portal; Catalogue TWV
TWV 41	TWV 41:B4	Napolitaine	B♭ major	oboe d'amore / other instrument and basso continuo	1. Napolitana. Modéré et simplement	# 33 from Der getreue Music-Meister	Telemann Portal; Catalogue TWV
TWV 41	TWV 41:B5	Sonata	B♭ major	flute / violin and basso continuo	1. Largo; 2. Allegro; 3. Dolce (G minor); 4. Vivace; 5. Allegro	# 4 from Continuation des Sonates méthodiques	Telemann Portal; Catalogue TWV
TWV 41	TWV 41:B6	Sonata	B♭ major	Oboe and basso continuo	1. Adagio; 2. Allegro; 3. Cantabile (G minor); 4. Vivace	# 9 from Essercizii Musici overo Dodeci Soli e Dodeci Trii à diversi stromenti	Telemann Portal; Catalogue TWV
TWV 41	TWV 41:B7	Sonata	B♭ major	violin and basso continuo	1. Adagio; 2. Allegro; 3. Adagio (G minor); 4. Allegro	# 5 from Solos for a Violin with Through Bass for the Harpsichord or Bass Violin	Telemann Portal; Catalogue TWV
TWV 41	TWV 41:B8	Sonata	B♭ major	violin and basso continuo	1. Andante; 2. Allegro; 3. Adagio (G minor); 4. Vivace; 5. Adagio; 6. Gigue	# 12 from 16 Sonaten à Violino e Continuo	Telemann Portal; Catalogue TWV
TWV 41	TWV 41:C1	Air	C major	Trumpet and basso continuo	—	# 18 from Der getreue Music-Meister	Telemann Portal; Catalogue TWV
TWV 41	TWV 41:C2	Sonata	C major	recorder and basso continuo	1. Cantabile; 2. Allegro; 3. Grave (A minor); 4. Vivace	# 56 from Der getreue Music-Meister	Telemann Portal; Catalogue TWV
TWV 41	TWV 41:C3	Sonata	C major	recorder / violin and basso continuo	1. Andante; 2. Allegro; 3. Presto; 4. Dolce (A minor); 5. Vivace	# 6 from Continuation des Sonates méthodiques	Telemann Portal; Catalogue TWV
TWV 41	TWV 41:C4	Sonata	C major	Violin / recorder and basso continuo	1. Largo; 2. Allegro; 3. Andante (D minor); 4. Vivace	# 4 from 12 Solos à violon ou traversière avec la basse chiffrée	Telemann Portal; Catalogue TWV
TWV 41	TWV 41:C5	Sonata	C major	flute and basso continuo	1. Adagio; 2. Larghetto (C minor); 3. Vivace	# 19 from Essercizii Musici overo Dodeci Soli e Dodeci Trii à diversi stromenti	Telemann Portal; Catalogue TWV
TWV 41	TWV 41:C6	Sonata	C major	violin and basso continuo	1. Adagio / Allegro; 2. Adagio (A minor); 3. Vivace	# 4 from 16 Sonaten à Violino e Continuo	Telemann Portal; Catalogue TWV
TWV 41	TWV 41:C7	Sonata	C major	violin and basso continuo	1. Adagio; 2. Allegro; 3. Grave (A minor); 4. Vivace	# 5 from 16 Sonaten à Violino e Continuo	Telemann Portal; Catalogue TWV
TWV 41	TWV 41:D1	Sonata	D major	violin and basso continuo	1. Allemanda. Largo; 2. Corrente. Vivace; 3. Sarabanda; 4. Gigue	# 2 from 6 Sonates à Violon seul, accompagné par le clavessin # 1 from 16 Sonaten à Violino e Continuo	Telemann Portal; Catalogue TWV
TWV 41	TWV 41:D2	Sonata	D major	violin and basso continuo	1. Andante; 2. Vivace; 3. Largo; 4. Vivace	# 3 from Sei Suonatine per Violino e Cembalo	Telemann Portal; Catalogue TWV
TWV 41	TWV 41:D3	Sonata	D major	Violin / Flute and Basso Continuo	1. Andante; 2. Presto; 3. Con tenerezza (D minor); 4. Allegro	# 5 from Sonate methodiche à Violino solo o Flauto traverso	Telemann Portal; Catalogue TWV
TWV 41	TWV 41:D4	Polonaise	D major	violin / flute and basso continuo	—	# 4 from Der getreue Music-Meister	Telemann Portal; Catalogue TWV
TWV 41	TWV 41:D5	Pastourelle	D major	instrument and basso continuo	—	# 12 from Der getreue Music-Meister	Telemann Portal; Catalogue TWV
TWV 41	TWV 41:D6	Sonata	D major	Cello and basso continuo	1. Lento; 2. Allegro; 3. Largo (B minor); 4. Allegro	# 16 from Der getreue Music-Meister	Telemann Portal; Catalogue TWV
TWV 41	TWV 41:D7	Sonatina	D major	flute / violin and basso continuo or for keyboard	1. Andante; 2. Allegro; 3. Largo; 4. Presto	# 3 from Neue Sonatinen	Telemann Portal; Catalogue TWV
TWV 41	TWV 41:D8	Sonata	D major	Violin / Flute and Basso Continuo	1. Andante; 2. Presto; 3. Cantabile; 4. Vivace	# 6 from 12 Solos à Violon ou Traversière avec la basse chiffrée	Telemann Portal; Catalogue TWV
TWV 41	TWV 41:D9	Sonata	D major	flute and basso continuo	1. Largo; 2. Vivace; 3. Dolce; 4. Allegro	# 3 from Essercizii Musici overo Dodeci Soli e Dodeci Trii à diversi stromenti	Telemann Portal; Catalogue TWV
TWV 41	TWV 41:D10	Sonata	D major	flute and basso continuo	1. Cantabile; 2. Vivace; 3. Affettuoso (G major); 4. Allegro	# 25 from Sammelhandschrift	Telemann Portal; Catalogue TWV
TWV 41	TWV 41:E1	Sonata	E major	violin and basso continuo	1. Affettuoso; 2. Vivace; 3. Adagio (C♯ minor); 4. Allegro	# 5 from Suonatine per Violino e Cembalo	Telemann Portal; Catalogue TWV
TWV 41	TWV 41:E2	Niaise	E major	solo instrument and basso continuo	1. Trainé	# 23 from Der getreue Music-Meister	Telemann Portal; Catalogue TWV
TWV 41	TWV 41:E3	Pastorale	E major	flute or other instrument, and basso continuo	—	# 31 from Der getreue Mueic-Meister	Telemann Portal; Catalogue TWV
TWV 41	TWV 41:E4	Sonatina	E major	Violin / Flute and Basso Continuo / Piano	1. Largo; 2. Vivace; 3. Cantabile (C♯ minor); 4. Vivace	# 6 from Neue Sonatinen	Telemann Portal; Catalogue TWV
TWV 41	TWV 41:E5	Sonata	E major	flute / violin and basso continuo	1. Andante; 2. Allegro; 3. Adagio (C♯ minor); 4. Gratioso e semplicemente (C♯ minor); 5. Presto	# 3 from Continuation des Sonates méthodiques	Telemann Portal; Catalogue TWV
TWV 41	TWV 41:E6	Sonata	E major	violin / flute and basso continuo	1. Soave; 2. Presto; 3. Dolce (C♯ minor); 4. Spirituoso	# 10 from 12 Solos à Violon ou Traversière avec la basse chiffrée	Telemann Portal; Catalogue TWV
TWV 41	TWV 41:E7	Sonata	E major	violin and basso continuo	1. No title 2. Allemande; 3. Adagio (C♯ minor); 4. Gigue	# 11 from 16 Sonaten à Violino e Continuo	Telemann Portal; Catalogue TWV
TWV 41	TWV 41:Es1	Partita	E♭ major	violin / flute / oboe and basso continuo	1. Affettuso; 2. Aria I. Presto; 3. Aria II. Vivace; 4. Aria III. Tempo di Ciaconna; 5. Aria IV. Allegro; 6. Aria V. Allegro; 7. Aria VI. Tempo di Menuet	# 6 from Kleine Cammer-Music	Telemann Portal; Catalogue TWV
TWV 41	TWV 41:F1	Sonata	F major	violin and basso continuo	1. Vivace; 2. Cantabile (D minor); 3. Presto	# 6 from Suonatine per Violino e Cambalo	Telemann Portal; Catalogue TWV
TWV 41	TWV 41:F2	Sonata	F major	recorder and basso continuo	1. Vivace; 2. Largo (D minor); 3. Allegro	# 1 from Der getreue Music-Meister	Telemann Portal; Catalogue TWV
TWV 41	TWV 41:F3	Sonata	F major	Violin / Flute and Basso Continuo	1. Andante; 2. Vivace; 3. Grave (D minor); 4. Allegro	# 1 from 12 Solos à Violon ou Traversière avec la basse chiffrée	Telemann Portal; Catalogue TWV
TWV 41	TWV 41:F4	Sonata	F major	violin and basso continuo	1. Andante; 2. Allegro; 3. Siciliano (D minor); 4. Allegro	# 1 from Essercizii Musici overo Dodeci Soli e Dodeci Trii à diversi stromenti	Telemann Portal; Catalogue TWV
TWV 41	TWV 41:F5	Sonata	F major	violin and basso continuo	1. Adagio; 2. Allegro; 3. Largo e Tremolo (C major); 4. Allegro	# 3 from Solos for a Violin with Through Bass for the Harpsichord or Bass Violin	Telemann Portal; Catalogue TWV
TWV 41	TWV 41:G1	Sonata	G major	violin and basso continuo	1. Largo; 2. Allegro; 3. Adagio (E minor); 4. Allegro	# 4 from 6 Sonates à Violon seul, accompagné par le Clavessin # 2 from 16 Sonaten à Violino e Continuo	Telemann Portal; Catalogue TWV
TWV 41	TWV 41:G2	Partita	G major	violin / flute / oboe and basso continuo	1. Siciliana; 2. Aria I. Allegro; 3. Aria II. Allegro; 4. Aria III. Allegro; 5. Aria IV. Affettuoso; 6. Aria V. Presto; 7. Aria VI. Tempo di Menuet	# 2 from Kleine Cammer-Music	Telemann Portal; Catalogue TWV
TWV 41	TWV 41:G3	Sonata	G major	violin and basso continuo	1. Affettuoso; 2. Vivace; 3. Adagio (E minor); 4. Presto	# 4 from Suonatine per Violino e Cembalo	Telemann Portal; Catalogue TWV
TWV 41	TWV 41:G4	Sonata	G major	Violin / Flute and Basso Continuo	1. Cantabile; 2. Vivace; 3. Mesto (E minor); 4. Spirituoso	# 7 from Sonate metodiche a Violino solo o Flauto traverso	Telemann Portal; Catalogue TWV
TWV 41	TWV 41:G5	Capriccio	G major	flute and basso continuo	1. Allegro; 2. Largo; 3. Vivace (D major); 4. Allegro; 5. Largo; 6. Vivace	# 14 from Der getreue Music-Meister	Telemann Portal; Catalogue TWV
TWV 41	TWV 41:G6	Sonata	G major	viola da gamba and basso continuo	1. Siciliana; 2. Vivace; 3. Dolce (G minor); 4. Scherzando	# 66 from Der getreue Music-Meister	Telemann Portal; Catalogue TWV
TWV 41	TWV 41:G7	Sonatina	G major	Violin / Flute and Basso Continuo	1. Cantabile; 2. Allegro; 3. Soave (G minor); 4. Vivace	# 4 from Neue Sonatinen	Telemann Portal; Catalogue TWV
TWV 41	TWV 41:G8	Sonata	G major	Violin / Flute and Basso Continuo	1. Andante; 2. Vivace; 3. Andante (E minor); 4. Allegro	# 8 from 12 Solos à Violon ou Traversière avec la basse chiffrée	Telemann Portal; Catalogue TWV
TWV 41	TWV 41:G9	Sonata	G major	flute and basso continuo	1. Cantabile; 2. Allegro; 3. Affettuoso (E minor); 4. Allegro	# 15 from Essercizii overo Dodeci Soli e Dodeci Trii à diversi stromenti	Telemann Portal; Catalogue TWV
TWV 41	TWV 41:G10	Sonata	G major	violin and basso continuo	1. No title 2. Allegro; 3. Adagio (E minor); 4. Vivace	# 6 from 16 Sonaten à Violino e Continuo	Telemann Portal; Catalogue TWV
TWV 41	TWV 41:G11	Sonata	G major	flute and basso continuo	1. Lentement; 2. Vite; 3. Grave (E minor); 4. Gay	# 23 from Sammelhandschrift	Telemann Portal; Catalogue TWV
TWV 41	TWV 41:G12	Sonata	G major	flute and basso continuo	1. Gracieusement; 2. Allemande; 3. Menuet; 4. Gigue; 5. Sarabande	# 24 from Sammelhandschrift	Telemann Portal; Catalogue TWV
TWV 41	TWV 41:a1	Sonata	A minor	violin and basso continuo	1. Allemanda. Largo; 2. Corrente. Vivace; 3. Sarabanda; 4. Gigue	# 5 from 6 Sonates à Violon seul, accompagné par le Clavessin	Telemann Portal; Catalogue TWV
TWV 41	TWV 41:a2	Sonata	A minor	Violin / Flute and Basso Continuo	1. Largo; 2. Allegro; 3. Ondeggiando (C major); 4. Allegro	# 3 from Sonate metodiche à Violino solo o Flauto traverso	Telemann Portal; Catalogue TWV
TWV 41	TWV 41:a3	Sonata	A minor	Oboe and basso continuo	1. Siciliana; 2. Spirituoso; 3. Andante (C major); 4. Vivace	# 50 from Der getreue Music-Meister	Telemann Portal; Catalogue TWV
TWV 41	TWV 41:a4	Sonatina	A minor	recorder / bassoon / cello and basso continuo	1. Andante; 2. Allegro; 3. Andante (C major); 4. Presto	# 1 from Neue Sonatinen	Telemann Portal; Catalogue TWV
TWV 41	TWV 41:a5	Sonata	A minor	Violin / Flute and Basso Continuo	1. Dolente; 2. Vivace; 3. Piacevole (C major); 4. Allegro	# 11 from 12 Solos à Violon ou Traversière avec la basse chiffrée	Telemann Portal; Catalogue TWV
TWV 41	TWV 41:a6	Sonata	A minor	viola da gamba and basso continuo	1. Largo; 2. Allegro; 3. Soave (C major); 4. Allegro	# 5 from Essercizii Musici overo Dodeci Soli e Dodeci Trii à diversi stromenti	Telemann Portal; Catalogue TWV
TWV 41	TWV 41:a7	Sonata	A minor	violin and basso continuo	1. Largo; 2. Allegro; 3. Adagio; 4. Allegro	# 2 from Solos for a Violin with Through Bass for the Harpsichord or Bass Violin	Telemann Portal; Catalogue TWV
TWV 41	TWV 41:a8	Sonata	A minor	flute and basso continuo	1. Andante; 2. Allegro; 3. Vivace	—	Telemann Portal; Catalogue TWV
TWV 41	TWV 41:a9	Sonata	A minor	flute and basso continuo	1. Andante; 2. No title 3. Largo (C major); 4. Allegro assai	—	Telemann Portal; Catalogue TWV
TWV 41	TWV 41:c1	Partita	C minor	Violin / Flute / Oboe and Basso Continuo	1. Adagio; 2. Aria I. Presto; 3. Aria II. Vivace; 4. Aria III. Vivace; 5. Aria IV. Allegro; 6. Aria V. Vivace	# 3 from Kleine Cammer-Music	Telemann Portal; Catalogue TWV
TWV 41	TWV 41:c2	Sonatina	C minor	recorder / bassoon / cello and basso continuo or keyboard	1. Largo; 2. Allegro; 3. Dolce (E♭ major); 4. Vivace	# 2 from Neue Sonatinen	Telemann Portal; Catalogue TWV
TWV 41	TWV 41:c3	Sonata	C minor	flute / violin and basso continuo	1. Allegro; 2. Adagio; 3. Allegro assai 4. Ondeggiando, ma non adagio (E♭ major); 5. Allegro	# 2 from Continuation des Sonates méthodiques	Telemann Portal; Catalogue TWV
TWV 41	TWV 41:c4	Sonata	C minor	violin and basso continuo	1. Adagio; 2. Allemande; 3. Aria; 4. Gigue	# 14 from 16 Sonaten à Violino e Continuo	Telemann Portal; Catalogue TWV
TWV 41	TWV 41:c5	Sonata	C minor	violin and basso continuo	1. Adagio; 2. Vivace; 3. Adagio; 4. Vivace	# 8 from 16 Sonaten à Violino e Continuo	Telemann Portal; Catalogue TWV
TWV 41	TWV 41:c6	Sonata	C minor	violin / oboe and basso continuo	1. Affettuoso; 2. Andante e staccato 3. Largo (E♭ major); 4. Allegro; 5. Grave (E♭ major); 6. Allegro cantabile	—	Telemann Portal; Catalogue TWV
TWV 41	TWV 41:d1	L'hiver	D minor	solo instrument and basso continuo	1. Gravement	# 6 from Der getreue Music-Meister	Telemann Portal; Catalogue TWV
TWV 41	TWV 41:d2	Sonata	D minor	flute / violin and basso continuo	1. Andante; 2. Allegro; 3. Tempo giusto (F major); 4. Vivace; 5. Allegro	# 5 from Continuation des Sonates méthodiques	Telemann Portal; Catalogue TWV
TWV 41	TWV 41:d3	Sonata	D minor	Violin / Flute and Basso Continuo	1. Andante; 2. Allegro assai 3.Largo (F major); 4. Allegro	# 7 from 12 Solos à Violon ou Traversière avec la basse chiffrée	Telemann Portal; Catalogue TWV
TWV 41	TWV 41:d4	Sonata	D minor	recorder and basso continuo	1. Affettuoso; 2. Presto; 3. Grave (G minor); 4. Allegro	# 7 from Essercizii Musici overo Dodeci Soli e Dodeci Trii à diversi stromenti	Telemann Portal; Catalogue TWV
TWV 41	TWV 41:d5	Sonata	D minor	violin and basso continuo	1. Andante; 2. Allegro; 3. Adagio (A minor); 4. Giga. Allegro	# 1 from Solos for a Violin with Through Bass for the Harpsichord or Bass Violin	Telemann Portal; Catalogue TWV
TWV 41	TWV 41:d6	Sonata	D minor	violin and basso continuo	1. Affettuoso; 2. Allegro; 3. Adagio (F major); 4. Allegro	# 10 from 16 Sonaten à Violino e Continuo	Telemann Portal; Catalogue TWV
TWV 41	TWV 41:d7	Sonata	D minor	violin and basso continuo	1. Adagio; 2. Allegro; 3. Adagio; 4. Allegro	# 15 from 16 Sonaten à Violino e Continuo	Telemann Portal; Catalogue TWV
TWV 41	TWV 41:e1	Partita	E minor	violin / flute / oboe and basso continuo	1. Andante; 2. Aria I. Vivace; 3. Aria II. Presto; 4. Aria III. Vivace; 5. Aria IV. Siciliana; 6. Aria V. Vivace; 7. Aria VI. Presto	# 5 from Kleine Cammer-Music	Telemann Portal; Catalogue TWV
TWV 41	TWV 41:e2	Sonata	E minor	violin / flute and basso continuo	1. Grave; 2. Vivace; 3. Cunando (G major); 4. Vivace	# 2 from Sonate methodiche a Violino solo o Flauta traverso	Telemann Portal; Catalogue TWV
TWV 41	TWV 41:e3	Sonatina	E minor	Violin / Flute and Basso Continuo / Piano	1. Andante; 2. Allegro; 3. Largo (B minor); 4. Vivace	# 1 from Neue Sonatinen	Telemann Portal; Catalogue TWV
TWV 41	TWV 41:e4	Sonata	E minor	Violin / Flute and Basso Continuo	1. Cantabile; 2. Allegro; 3. Tempo giusto (A minor); 4. Presto	# 2 from 12 Solos à Violon ou Traversière avec la basse chiffrée	Telemann Portal; Catalogue TWV
TWV 41	TWV 41:e5	Sonata	E minor	viola da gamba and basso continuo	1. Cantabile; 2. Allegro; 3. Recitativo / Arioso (G major); 4. Vivace	# 17 from Essercizii Musici overo Dodeci Soli e Dodeci Trii à diversi stromenti	Telemann Portal; Catalogue TWV
TWV 41	TWV 41:e6	Sonata	E minor	Oboe and basso continuo	1. Largo; 2. Allegro; 3. Grave (G major); 4. Vivace	# 21 from Essercizii Musici overo Dodeci Soli e Dodeci Trii à diversi stromenti	Telemann Portal; Catalogue TWV
TWV 41	TWV 41:e7	Sonata	E minor	violin and basso continuo	1. Adagio; 2. Andante; 3. Adagio (G major); 4. Allegro	# 2 from Solos for a Violin with Through Bass for the Harpsichord or Bass Violin	Telemann Portal; Catalogue TWV
TWV 41	TWV 41:e8	Sonata	E minor	violin and basso continuo	1. No title 2. Vivace; 3. Adagio (G major); 4. Allegro	# 7 from 16 Sonaten à Violino e Continuo	Telemann Portal; Catalogue TWV
TWV 41	TWV 41:e9	Sonata	E minor	flute and basso continuo	1. No title 2. Allemande; 3. Courante; 4. Menuet I 5. Menuet II (G major); 6. Air; 7. Gigue	# 31 from Sammelhandschrift	Telemann Portal; Catalogue TWV
TWV 41	TWV 41:e10	Sonata	E minor	flute and basso continuo	1. Andante; 2. Allegro; 3. Largo (G major); 4. Vivace	# 43 from Sammelhandschrift	Telemann Portal; Catalogue TWV
TWV 41	TWV 41:e11	Sonata	E minor	flute and basso continuo	1. Andante; 2. Presto; 3. Grave (G major); 4. Tempo di Menuet	# 54 from Sammelhandschrift	Telemann Portal; Catalogue TWV
TWV 41	TWV 41:f1	Sonata	F minor	Bassoon / Recorder and Basso Continuo	1. Adagio; 2. Allegro; 3. Andante (C minor); 4. Vivace	# 36 from Der getreue Music-Meister	Telemann Portal; Catalogue TWV
TWV 41	TWV 41:f2	Sonata	F minor	recorder and basso continuo	1. Adagio; 2. Allegro; 3. Adagio (A♭ major); 4. Gigue	# 37 from Sammelhandschrift	Telemann Portal; Catalogue TWV
TWV 41	TWV 41:fis1	Sonata	F♯ minor	Violin / Flute and Basso Continuo	1. Teneramente; 2. Spirituoso; 3. Gratioso (A major); 4. Allegro	# 12 from 12 Solos à Violon ou Traversière avec la basse chiffrée	Telemann Portal; Catalogue TWV
TWV 41	TWV 41:fis2	Sonata	F♯ minor	violin and basso continuo	1. Largo; 2. Andante (A major); 3. Adagio; 4. Un poco presto	—	Telemann Portal; Catalogue TWV
TWV 41	TWV 41:g1	Sonata	G minor	violin and basso continuo	1. Adagio; 2. Allegro; 3. Adagio; 4. Vivace. Allegro	# 1 from 6 Sonates à Violin seul, accompagné par le Clavessin # 3 from 16 Sonaten à Violino e Continuo	Telemann Portal; Catalogue TWV
TWV 41	TWV 41:g2	Partita	G minor	violin / flute / oboe and basso continuo	1. Grave; 2. Aria I. Allegro; 3. Aria II. Allegro; 4. Aria III. Tempo di Menuet; 5. Aria IV. Allegro; 6. Aria V. Tempo giusto 7. Aria VI. Allegro assai	# 4 from Kleine Cammer-Music	Telemann Portal; Catalogue TWV
TWV 41	TWV 41:g3	Sonata	G minor	violin / oboe and basso continuo	1. Adagio; 2. Vivace; 3. Grave; 4. Allegro	# 1 from Sonate metodiche a Violino solo o Flauto traverso	Telemann Portal; Catalogue TWV
TWV 41	TWV 41:g4	Suite	G minor	violin / oboe and basso continuo	1. Ouverture / Très vite 2. Sans Souci; 3. Hornpipe; 4. Gavotte; 5. Passepied; 6. Irlandoise. Vitement	# 8 from Der getreue Music-Meister	Telemann Portal; Catalogue TWV
TWV 41	TWV 41:g5	Sonata	G minor	solo instrument and basso continuo	1. Grave; 2. Allabreve; 3. Adagio (E♭ major); 4. Vivace	# 63 from Der getreue Music-Meister	Telemann Portal; Catalogue TWV
TWV 41	TWV 41:g6	Sonata	G minor	Oboe and basso continuo	1. Largo; 2. Presto; 3. Tempo giusto (G major); 4. Andante; 5. Allegro	# 5 from Musique de table III	Telemann Portal; Catalogue TWV
TWV 41	TWV 41:g7	Sonata	G minor	Violin / Flute and Basso Continuo	1. Largo; 2. Allegro; 3. Grave; 4. Vivace	# 5 from 12 Solos à Violin ou Traversière avec la basse chiffrée	Telemann Portal; Catalogue TWV
TWV 41	TWV 41:g8	Sonata	G minor	violin and basso continuo	1. Largo; 2. Allegro; 3. Largo (B♭ majeur); 4. Allegro	# 4 from Solos for a Violin with Through Bass for the Harpsichord or Bass Violin	Telemann Portal; Catalogue TWV
TWV 41	TWV 41:g9	Sonata	G minor	violin and basso continuo	—	—	Telemann Portal; Catalogue TWV
TWV 41	TWV 41:g10	Sonata	G minor	Oboe and basso continuo	1. Adagio; 2. Allabreve; 3. Adagio (C minor); 4. Allegro	—	Telemann Portal; Catalogue TWV
TWV 41	TWV 41:g11	Sonata	G minor	violin and basso continuo	1. Adagio; 2. Vivace; 3. Gigue	# 9 from 16 Sonaten à Violino e Continuo	Telemann Portal; Catalogue TWV
TWV 41	TWV 41:g12	Sonata	G minor	Oboe and basso continuo	1. Affettuoso; 2. Allegro; 3. Arioso; 4. Gigue	—	Telemann Portal; Catalogue TWV
TWV 41	TWV 41:h1	Sonata	B minor	violin and basso continuo	1. Cantabile; 2. Allegro assai 3. Andante (D major); 4. Vivace	# 3 from 6 Sonates à Violon seul, accompagné par le Clavessin	Telemann Portal; Catalogue TWV
TWV 41	TWV 41:h2	Sonata	B minor	flute and basso continuo	1. Tendrement; 2. Gayment; 3. Gravement (D major); 4. Vite	# 64 from Der getreue Music-Meister	Telemann Portal; Catalogue TWV
TWV 41	TWV 41:h3	Sonata	B minor	flute / violin and basso continuo	1. Siciliana; 2. Allegro; 3. Dolce (E minor); 4. Grave (F♯ major); 5. Vivace; 6. Presto	# 1 from Continuation des Sonates méthodiques	Telemann Portal; Catalogue TWV
TWV 41	TWV 41:h4	Sonata	B minor	flute and basso continuo	1. Cantabile; 2. Allegro; 3. Dolce (D major); 4. Allegro	# 5 from Musique de table I	Telemann Portal; Catalogue TWV
TWV 41	TWV 41:h5	Sonata	B minor	Violin / Flute and Basso Continuo	1. Tardi e semplicemente 2. Vivace; 3. Pomposo (D major); 4. Allegro assai	# 9 from 12 Solos à Violon ou Traversière avec la basse chiffrée	Telemann Portal; Catalogue TWV
TWV 41	TWV Anh. 41:A1	Sonata	A major	flute / violin / viola / viola da gamba	—	= TWV 41:B3	Telemann Portal; Catalogue TWV
TWV 41	TWV Anh. 41:C1	Suite	C major	soprano recorder or other instrument with piano	—	Set as a movement within Ouverture TWV 55:D11	Telemann Portal; Catalogue TWV
TWV 41	TWV Anh. 41:C2	Suite	C major	alto recorder or other instrument with piano	—	Set as a movement within the Ouvertures TWV 55:G12 and TWV 55:A2	Telemann Portal; Catalogue TWV
TWV 41	TWV Anh. 41:C3	Fanfare	C major	cello and piano	—	Version of the 5th movement of TWV 55:A2	Telemann Portal; Catalogue TWV
TWV 41	TWV Anh. 41:D1	Sonata	D major	viola viola and basso continuo	1. Vivace; 2. Adagio (B minor); 3. Allegro	—	Telemann Portal; Catalogue TWV
TWV 41	TWV Anh. 41:D2	Suite	D major	viola and piano	—	= TWV 55:D6	Telemann Portal; Catalogue TWV
TWV 41	TWV Anh. 41:F1	Suite	F major	soprano recorder / other instrument and piano	—	Set as a movement within Ouvertures TWV 55:F7, TWV 55:G2 and TWV 55:F6	Telemann Portal; Catalogue TWV
TWV 41	TWV Anh. 41:F2	Suite	F major	alto recorder / other instrument and piano	—	Set as a movement within Ouvertures TWV 55:D5, TWV 55:F7, and TWV 55:C4	Telemann Portal; Catalogue TWV
TWV 41	TWV Anh. 41:a1	Partita	A minor	alto recorder and piano	—	Set as a movement in 41:e1, 41:G2, and 41:g2	Telemann Portal; Catalogue TWV
TWV 41	TWV Anh. 41:a2	Suite	A minor	flute and piano	—	Version of the Ouverture TWV 55:a2	Telemann Portal; Catalogue TWV

=== TWV 42 – Chamber music for 2 instruments with basso continuo ===
Section	Catalogue	Title	Key	Scoring	Movements	Observation	URL
TWV 42	TWV 42:A1	Scherzo	A major	2 flutes / violins and basso continuo	1. Allegro; 2. Moderato (A minor); 3. Allegro	# 1 from Trietti methodichi e Scherzi	Telemann Portal; Catalogue TWV
TWV 42	TWV 42:A2	Sonata	A major	2 violins / flutes and basso continuo	1. Cantabile; 2. Allabreve; 3. Lento (A minor); 4. Allegro assai	# 3 from 6 Trio a Violini e Basso	Telemann Portal; Catalogue TWV
TWV 42	TWV 42:A3	Concerto	A major	flute, harpsichord and basso continuo	1. Tempo giusto 2. Vivace; 3. Adagio (F♯ minor); 4. Presto	# 3 from 6 Concerts et 6 Suites	Telemann Portal; Catalogue TWV
TWV 42	TWV 42:A4	Scherzo	A major	violin, viola and basso continuo	1. Introduzione. Vivace; 2. Moderato; 3. Allegro; 4. Tempo giusto 5. Allegro; 6. Largo; 7. Presto	# 1 from Scherzi melodichi per divertimento di coloro # Pyrmonter Kurwoche, 1. Montag	Telemann Portal; Catalogue TWV
TWV 42	TWV 42:A5	Sonata	A major	2 violins / flutes and basso continuo	1. Largo; 2. Allemanda. Presto; 3. Sarabande. Grave (F♯ minor); 4. Corrente. Vivace	# 2 from Sonates Corellisantes	Telemann Portal; Catalogue TWV
TWV 42	TWV 42:A6	Trio	A major	flute, harpsichord and basso continuo	1. Largo; 2. Allegro; 3. Largo; 4. Vivace	# 8 from Essercizii Musici overo Dodeci Soli e Dodeci Trii a diversi stromenti	Telemann Portal; Catalogue TWV
TWV 42	TWV 42:A7	Sonata	A major	2 flutes / violins / other instruments and basso continuo	1. Larghetto; 2. Allegro; 3. Grave (F♯ minor); 4. Presto	# 3 from Sonates en trio	Telemann Portal; Catalogue TWV
TWV 42	TWV 42:A8	Sonata	A major	2 violins and basso continuo	1. Affettuoso; 2. Vivace; 3. Largo; 4. Allegro	—	Telemann Portal; Catalogue TWV
TWV 42	TWV 42:A9	Sonata	A major	flute, violin / oboe d'amore and basso continuo	1. Vivace; 2. Soave (F♯ minor); 3. Vivace	—	Telemann Portal; Catalogue TWV
TWV 42	TWV 42:A10	Sonata	A major	Oboe, viola da gamba and basso continuo	1. Cantabile; 2. Vivace; 3. Andante (E major); 4. No title	—	Telemann Portal; Catalogue TWV
TWV 42	TWV 42:A11	Sonata	A major	2 violins and basso continuo	1. Affettuoso; 2. Vivace; 3. Grave (F♯ minor); 4. Vivace	—	Telemann Portal; Catalogue TWV
TWV 42	TWV 42:A12	Andante	A major	2 violins and basso continuo	—	—	Telemann Portal; Catalogue TWV
TWV 42	TWV 42:A13	Trio	A major	2 violins and basso continuo	1. Adagio; 2. Allegro; 3. Allegro	—	Telemann Portal; Catalogue TWV
TWV 42	TWV 42:A14	Sonata	A major	violin, oboe d'amore and basso continuo	1. Largo; 2. Allegro; 3. Siciliano; 4. Allegro	—	Telemann Portal; Catalogue TWV
TWV 42	TWV 42:A15	Vivace	A major	2 flutes and basso continuo	—	—	Telemann Portal; Catalogue TWV
TWV 42	TWV 42:A16	Sonata	A major	—	2./4. Gay	2nd or 4th movement	Telemann Portal; Catalogue TWV
TWV 42	TWV 42:A17	Sonata	A major	2 violins and basso continuo	—	—	Telemann Portal; Catalogue TWV
TWV 42	TWV 42:B1	Trio	B♭ major	Oboe, violin and basso continuo	1. Vivace; 2. Siciliana (G minor); 3. Allegro	# 1 from 6 Trios	Telemann Portal; Catalogue TWV
TWV 42	TWV 42:B2	Suite	B♭ major	flute, harpsichord / violin and basso continuo Suite	1. Grave / Vivace; 2. Moderato; 3. Menuet I / Menuet II; 4. Presto; 5. Dolce; 6. Vivace; 7. Allegro	# 2 from 6 Concerts et 6 Suites	Telemann Portal; Catalogue TWV
TWV 42	TWV 42:B3	Scherzo	B♭ major	violin, viola and basso continuo	1. Introduzione. Allegro; 2. Vivace; 3. Presto; 4. Allegro; 5. Largo; 6. Vivace; 7. Allegro	# 2 from Scherzi melodichi per divertimento di coloro / Pyrmonter Kurwoche, 2. Dienstag	Telemann Portal; Catalogue TWV
TWV 42	TWV 42:B4	Trio	B♭ major	recorder, harpsichord and basso continuo	1. Dolce; 2. Vivace; 3. Siciliana (G minor); 4. Vivace	# 16 from Essercizii Musici overo Dodeci Soli e Dodeci Trii a diversi stromenti	Telemann Portal; Catalogue TWV
TWV 42	TWV 42:B5	Sonata	B♭ major	violin, bassoon and basso continuo	1. Vivace; 2. Siciliana (G minor); 3. Vivace	—	Telemann Portal; Catalogue TWV
TWV 42	TWV 42:B6	Sonata	B♭ major	2 violins and basso continuo	1. Grave; 2. Presto; 3. Largo (G minor); 4. Allegro	—	Telemann Portal; Catalogue TWV
TWV 42	TWV 42:B7	Sonata	B♭ major	oboe, bassoon and basso continuo	—	—	Telemann Portal; Catalogue TWV
TWV 42	TWV 42:C1	Trio	C major	2 recorders and basso continuo / in A major, for 2 flutes or violins and basso continuo	1. Introduzione. Vivace / Andante (A minor) / Vivace; 2. Xantippe; 3. Lucretia. Largo (C minor); 4. Corinna; 5. Clelia. Spirituoso; 6. Dido. Triste	# 34 from Der getreue Music-Master	Telemann Portal; Catalogue TWV
TWV 42	TWV 42:C2	Sonata	C major	recorder and viola da gamba / violin and bass	1. Dolce; 2. Allegro; 3. Grave (C minor); 4. Vivace	—	Telemann Portal; Catalogue TWV
TWV 42	TWV 42:C3	Sonata	C major	2 violins and basso continuo	1. Presto; 2. Largo (A minor); 3. Allegro	—	Telemann Portal; Catalogue TWV
TWV 42	TWV 42:C4	Sonata	C major	violin, oboe and basso continuo	—	—	Telemann Portal; Catalogue TWV
TWV 42	TWV 42:D1	Trio	D major	2 violins and basso continuo	1. Soave; 2. Vivace; 3. Largo; 4. Presto	# 4 from 6 Trios	Telemann Portal; Catalogue TWV
TWV 42	TWV 42:D2	Trio	D major	2 flutes / violins and basso continuo	1. Vivace; 2. Andante (B minor); 3. Vivace	# 2 from Trietti methodichi e Scherzi	Telemann Portal; Catalogue TWV
TWV 42	TWV 42:D3	Scherzo	D major	2 flutes / violins and basso continuo	1. Allegro; 2. Largo (B minor); 3. Allegro	# 3 from Trietti methodichi e Scherzi	Telemann Portal; Catalogue TWV
TWV 42	TWV 42:D4	Sonata	D major	2 violins / flutes and basso continuo	1. Soave; 2. Allegro assai 3. Andante (B minor); 4. Vivace	# 6 from 6 Trio a Violini e Basso	Telemann Portal; Catalogue TWV
TWV 42	TWV 42:D5	Trio	D major	2 flutes and basso continuo	1. Andante; 2. Allegro; 3. Grave (B minor) / Largo (B minor); 4. Vivace	# 4 from Musique de table III	Telemann Portal; Catalogue TWV
TWV 42	TWV 42:D6	Concerto	D major	flute, harpsichord / violin and basso continuo	1. Piacevole; 2. Allegro; 3. Largo (B minor); 4. Vivace	# 1 from 6 Concerts et 6 Suites	Telemann Portal; Catalogue TWV
TWV 42	TWV 42:D7	Scherzo	D major	violin, viola and basso continuo	1. Introduzione. Largo / Presto; 2. Andante; 3. Moderato; 4. Vivace; 5. Dolce; 6. Vivace; 7. Allegro	# 7 from Scherzi melodichi per divertimento di coloro Pyrmonter Kurwoche, 7. Sonntag	Telemann Portal; Catalogue TWV
TWV 42	TWV 42:D8	Sonata	D major	2 violins / flutes and basso continuo	1. Pastorale. Moderato; 2. Corrente. Vivace; 3. Gavotta. Allegro; 4. Grave (B minor); 5. Vivace	# 6 from Sonates Corellisantes	Telemann Portal; Catalogue TWV
TWV 42	TWV 42:D9	Trio	D major	violin, viola da gamba and basso continuo	1. Dolce; 2. Presto; 3. Pastorale (A major); 4. Vivace	# 20 from Essercizii Musici overo Dodeci SOli e Dodeci Trii à diversi stromenti	Telemann Portal; Catalogue TWV
TWV 42	TWV 42:D10	Intrada	D major	flute, violin and basso continuo	1. Intrada; 2. Tournée; 3. Aria; 4. Menuet alternativo 5. Trio (D minor); 6. Balletto	—	Telemann Portal; Catalogue TWV
TWV 42	TWV 42:D11	Sonata	D major	violin, viola and basso continuo	1. Allegro; 2. Adagio; 3. Vivace	—	Telemann Portal; Catalogue TWV
TWV 42	TWV 42:D12	Sonata	D major	2 violins and basso continuo	1. Affettuoso; 2. Allegro in Canone; 3. Largo (B minor); 4. Allegro	—	Telemann Portal; Catalogue TWV
TWV 42	TWV 42:D13	Sonata	D major	2 violins and basso continuo	1. Andante; 2. Allegro; 3. Adagio (B minor); 4. Allegro	—	Telemann Portal; Catalogue TWV
TWV 42	TWV 42:D14	Trio	D major	2 violins and basso continuo	1. Allegro; 2. Adagio; 3. Allegro	—	Telemann Portal; Catalogue TWV
TWV 42	TWV 42:D15	Trio	D major	flute, violin / viola d'amore and basso continuo	1. Adagio; 2. Presto; 3. Con gravita ma non grave 4. Allegro	—	Telemann Portal; Catalogue TWV
TWV 42	TWV 42:D16	Trio	D major	2 flutes and basso continuo	1. Gracieusement; 2. Viste; 3. Tendrement; 4. Gigue	—	Telemann Portal; Catalogue TWV
TWV 42	TWV 42:D17	Sonata	D major	flute, violin	1. Affettuoso; 2. Vivace; 3. Adagio (B minor); 4. Spirituoso	—	Telemann Portal; Catalogue TWV
TWV 42	TWV 42:D18	Sonata	D major	violin, viola da gamba and basso continuo	—	—	Telemann Portal; Catalogue TWV
TWV 42	TWV 42:D19	Trio	D major	—	3. No title 4. Allegro	Probably 3rd and 4th movements	Telemann Portal; Catalogue TWV
TWV 42	TWV 42:E1	Scherzo	E major	2 flutes / violins and basso continuo	1. Vivace; 2. Largo; 3. Vivace	# 2 from Trietti methodichi e Scherzi	Telemann Portal; Catalogue TWV
TWV 42	TWV 42:E2	Suite	E major	flute, harpsichord / violin and basso continuo Suite	1. Gratioso / Allegro; 2. Moderato; 3. Vivace (E major / E minor / E major); 4. Presto; 5. Dolce; 6. Allegro; 7. Vivace	# 4 from 6 Concerts et 6 Suites	Telemann Portal; Catalogue TWV
TWV 42	TWV 42:E3	Sonata	E major	2 violins / flutes and basso continuo	1. Andante; 2. Allegro; 3. Largo (C♯ minor); 4. Giga. Allegro	# 4 from Sonates Corellisantes	Telemann Portal; Catalogue TWV
TWV 42	TWV 42:E4	Trio	E major	flute, violin and basso continuo	1. Soave; 2. Presto; 3. Andante (E minor); 4. Scherzando	# 18 from Essercizii Musici overo Dodeci Soli e Dodeci Trii à diversi stromenti	Telemann Portal; Catalogue TWV
TWV 42	TWV 42:E5	Sonata	E major	2 violins and basso continuo	1. Affettuoso; 2. Presto; 3. Adagio (C♯ minor); 4. Allegro	—	Telemann Portal; Catalogue TWV
TWV 42	TWV 42:E6	Sonata	E major	violin, viola da gamba and basso continuo	1. Allegro; 2. Largo (C♯ minor); 3. Allegro	—	Telemann Portal; Catalogue TWV
TWV 42	TWV 42:E7	Sonata	E major	violin, viola da gamba and basso continuo	1. Siciliana; 2. Presto; 3. Andante (C♯ minor); 4. Vivace	—	Telemann Portal; Catalogue TWV
TWV 42	TWV 42:Es1	Trio	E♭ major	2 violins and basso continuo	1. Affettuoso; 2. Vivace; 3. Grave (C minor); 4. Allegro	# 4 from Musique de table I	Telemann Portal; Catalogue TWV
TWV 42	TWV 42:Es2	Scherzo	E♭ major	violin, viola and basso continuo	1. Introduzione. Allegro; 2. Spirituoso; 3. Presto; 4. Vivace; 5. Gratioso; 6. Allegro; 7. Vivace	# 4 from Scherzi melodichi per divertimento di coloro / Pyrmonter Kurwoche, 4. Donnertag	Telemann Portal; Catalogue TWV
TWV 42	TWV 42:Es3	Trio	E♭ major	oboe, harpsichord and basso continuo	1. Largo; 2. Vivace; 3. Mesto (C minor); 4. Vivace	# 24 from Essercizii Musici overo Dodeci Soli e Dodeci Trii à diversi stromenti	Telemann Portal; Catalogue TWV
TWV 42	TWV 42:F1	Trio	F major	violin, bassoon/cello and basso continuo	1. Allegro; 2. Soave; 3. Presto	# 6 from 6 Trios	Telemann Portal; Catalogue TWV
TWV 42	TWV 42:F2	Sonata	F major	2 violins / flutes and basso continuo	1. Largo; 2. Presto; 3. Dolce; 4. Grave (D minor); 5. Allegro	# 1 from Sonates Corellisantes	Telemann Portal; Catalogue TWV
TWV 42	TWV 42:F3	Trio	F major	recorder, viola da gamba and basso continuo	1. Vivace; 2. Mesto; 3. Allegro	# 14 from Essercizii Musici overo Dodeci Soli e Dodeci Trii à diversi stromenti	Telemann Portal; Catalogue TWV
TWV 42	TWV 42:F4	Concerto	F major	Oboe, violin and basso continuo	1. Grave; 2. Vivace; 3. Adagio (D minor); 4. Allegro	—	Telemann Portal; Catalogue TWV
TWV 42	TWV 42:F5	Sonata	F major	flute, viola da gamba and basso continuo	1. Dolce; 2. Allegro; 3. Largo (D minor); 4. No title	—	Telemann Portal; Catalogue TWV
TWV 42	TWV 42:F6	Sonata	F major	flute, viola da gamba / violin and basso continuo	1. Vivace; 2. Largo (D minor); 3. Allegro	—	Telemann Portal; Catalogue TWV
TWV 42	TWV 42:F7	Sonata	F major	2 recorders and basso continuo	1. Affettuoso; 2. Allegro; 3. Adagio (D minor); 4. Vivace	—	Telemann Portal; Catalogue TWV
TWV 42	TWV 42:F8	Sonata	F major	flute, violin and basso continuo	1. Andante; 2. Allegro; 3. Largo (D minor); 4. Allegro	—	Telemann Portal; Catalogue TWV
TWV 42	TWV 42:F9	Sonata	F major	flute, oboe and basso continuo	1. Allegro; 2. Affettuoso; 3. Presto	—	Telemann Portal; Catalogue TWV
TWV 42	TWV 42:F10	Sonata	F major	violin, viola da gamba and basso continuo	1. Grave; 2. Allegro; 3. Andante (D minor); 4. Vivace	—	Telemann Portal; Catalogue TWV
TWV 42	TWV 42:F11	Andante	F major	2 violins and basso continuo	1. Andante; 2. Allegro	—	Telemann Portal; Catalogue TWV
TWV 42	TWV 42:F12	Sonata	F major	violin, oboe and basso continuo	1. Affettuoso; 2. Vivace; 3. Grave (D minor); 4. Allegro	—	Telemann Portal; Catalogue TWV
TWV 42	TWV 42:F13	Trio	F major	violin, oboe and basso continuo	1. Affettuoso; 2. Allegro; 3. Affettuoso (D minor); 4. Presto	—	Telemann Portal; Catalogue TWV
TWV 42	TWV 42:F14	Concerto	F major	flute, horn and basso continuo	1. Concerto; 2. Loure (D minor); 3. Tempo di Minuet	—	Telemann Portal; Catalogue TWV
TWV 42	TWV 42:F15	Trio	F major	recorder, oboe and basso continuo	1. Largo; 2. Allegro; 3. Largo (D minor); 4. Allegro	—	Telemann Portal; Catalogue TWV
TWV 42	TWV 42:F16	Trio	F major	Oboe, bassoon and basso continuo	1. Adagio; 2. Presto; 3. Sarabande; 4. Menuet	—	Telemann Portal; Catalogue TWV
TWV 42	TWV 42:F17	Sonata	F major	violin, oboe and basso continuo	—	—	Telemann Portal; Catalogue TWV
TWV 42	TWV 42:G1	Trio	G major	flute, violin and basso continuo	1. Affettuoso; 2. Vivace; 3. Largo (E minor); 4. Vivace	# 3 from 6 Trios	Telemann Portal; Catalogue TWV
TWV 42	TWV 42:G2	Trio	G major	2 flutes and basso continuo Trio	1. Allegro; 2. Grave; 3. Presto	# 1 from Trietti methodichi e Scherzi	Telemann Portal; Catalogue TWV
TWV 42	TWV 42:G3	Sonata	G major	2 violins / flutes and basso continuo	1. Dolce; 2. Allegro; 3. Affettuoso (E minor); 4. Vivace	# 1 from 6 Trio a Violini e Basso	Telemann Portal; Catalogue TWV
TWV 42	TWV 42:G4	Suite	G major	flute, harpsichord / violin and basso continuo	1. Prélude. Largo / Allegro; 2. Air I. Un poco vivace 3. Air II. Dolce; 4. Air III. Allegro; 5. Air IV. Spirituoso; 6. Air V. Piacevole; 7. Air VI. Allegro	# 1 from 6 Concerts et 6 Suites	Telemann Portal; Catalogue TWV
TWV 42	TWV 42:G5	Scherzo	G major	violin, viola and basso continuo	1. Introduzione. Vivace; 2. Vivace; 3. Presto; 4. Moderato; 5. Presto; 6. Vivace; 7. Allegro	# 3 from Scherzi melodichi per divertimento di coloro / Pyrmonter Kurwoche 3. Mittwoch	Telemann Portal; Catalogue TWV
TWV 42	TWV 42:G6	Trio	G major	viola da gamba, harpsichord and basso continuo	1. Andante; 2. Allegro; 3. Largo (E minor); 4. Presto	# 4 from Essercizii Musici overo Dodeci Soli e Dodeci Trii a diversi stromenti	Telemann Portal; Catalogue TWV
TWV 42	TWV 42:G7	Sonata	G major	violin, cello and basso continuo	1. Vivace; 2. Adagio (E minor); 3. Allegro	—	Telemann Portal; Catalogue TWV
TWV 42	TWV 42:G8	Sonata	G major	Oboe, viola da gamba and basso continuo	1. Soave; 2. Allegro; 3. Andante (E minor); 4. Allegro	—	Telemann Portal; Catalogue TWV
TWV 42	TWV 42:G9	Sonata	G major	2 violins and basso continuo	1. Grave; 2. Presto; 3. Andante (E minor); 4. Un poco Allegro	—	Telemann Portal; Catalogue TWV
TWV 42	TWV 42:G10	Sonata	G major	violin, viola da gamba and basso continuo	1. Cantabile; 2. Vivace; 3. Affettuoso (E minor); 4. Allegro	—	Telemann Portal; Catalogue TWV
TWV 42	TWV 42:G11	Trio	G major	2 violins and basso continuo	1. Affettuoso; 2. Allegro; 3. Grave (E minor); 4. Vivace	—	Telemann Portal; Catalogue TWV
TWV 42	TWV 42:G12	Sonata	G major	flute, violin and basso continuo	1. Affettuoso; 2. Vivace; 3. Grave (E minor); 4. Vivace	# 5 from Six Sonates en trio dans le goût italien	Telemann Portal; Catalogue TWV
TWV 42	TWV 42:G13	Sonata	G major	flute, oboe/violin and basso continuo	1. Adagio; 2. Allegro; 3. Largo; 4. Allegro	—	Telemann Portal; Catalogue TWV
TWV 42	TWV 42:G14	Sonata	G major	violin, viola da gamba and basso continuo	—	—	Telemann Portal; Catalogue TWV
TWV 42	TWV 42:G15	Sonata	G major	2 violins and basso continuo	—	—	Telemann Portal; Catalogue TWV
TWV 42	TWV 42:a1	Trio	A minor	recorder, violin and basso continuo	1. Affettuoso; 2. Vivace; 3. Grave (C major); 4. Menuet	# 2 from 6 Trios	Telemann Portal; Catalogue TWV
TWV 42	TWV 42:a2	Concerto	A minor	flute, harpsichord / violin and basso continuo	1. Andante; 2. Allegro; 3. Largo (G major); 4. Allegro assai	# 6 from 6 Concerts et 6 Suites	Telemann Portal; Catalogue TWV
TWV 42	TWV 42:a3	Suite	A minor	flute, harpsichord / violin and basso continuo Suite	1. Largo / Vivace; 2. Un poco Vivace (A minor / A major / A minor); 3. Andante; 4. Presto; 5. Un poco Vivace; 6. Vivace; 7. Allegro	# 5 from 6 Concerte et 6 Suites	Telemann Portal; Catalogue TWV
TWV 42	TWV 42:a4	Trio	A minor	recorder, violin and basso continuo	1. Largo; 2. Vivace; 3. Affettuoso; 4. Allegro	# 10 from Essercizii Musici overo Dodeci Soli e Dodeci Trii a diversi stromenti	Telemann Portal; Catalogue TWV
TWV 42	TWV 42:a5	Sonata	A minor	2 violins and basso continuo	1. Affettuoso; 2. Allegro; 3. Grave (do majeur); 4. Vivace	—	Telemann Portal; Catalogue TWV
TWV 42	TWV 42:a6	Sonata	A minor	recorder, oboe and basso continuo	1. Largo; 2. Allegro; 3. Cantabile; 4. Allegro	—	Telemann Portal; Catalogue TWV
TWV 42	TWV 42:a7	Sonata	A minor	flute, viola da gamba and basso continuo	1. Andante; 2. Allegro; 3. Adagio (E minor); 4. Allegro	—	Telemann Portal; Catalogue TWV
TWV 42	TWV 42:a8	Sonata	A minor	violin, viola and basso continuo	1. Andante; 2. Allegro (A major / C major); 3. Dolce; 4. Allegro	—	Telemann Portal; Catalogue TWV
TWV 42	TWV 42:a9	Sonata	A minor	2 flutes and basso continuo	1. Largo; 2. Allegro; 3. Adagio (C major); 4. Allegro	—	Telemann Portal; Catalogue TWV
TWV 42	TWV 42:c1	Sonata	C minor	2 violins / flutes and basso continuo	1. Largo; 2. Vivace; 3. Grave; 4. Allegro	# 2 from 6 Trio a Violini e Basso	Telemann Portal; Catalogue TWV
TWV 42	TWV 42:c2	Trio	C minor	recorder, oboe and basso continuo	1. Largo; 2. Vivace; 3. Andante; 4. Allegro	# 2 from Essercizii Musici overo Dodeci Soli e Dodeci Trii à diversi stromenti	Telemann Portal; Catalogue TWV
TWV 42	TWV 42:c3	Sonata	C minor	viola da gamba, oboe and basso continuo	1. Gratioso; 2. Con contento 3. Sospirando (E♭ major); 4. Spirituoso; 5. Vivace	—	Telemann Portal; Catalogue TWV
TWV 42	TWV 42:c4	Sonata	C minor	2 oboes/violins and basso continuo	1. Lentement; 2. Vite; 3. Lentement avec doucor 4. Gay	—	Telemann Portal; Catalogue TWV
TWV 42	TWV 42:c5	Sonata	C minor	Oboe, Violetta and Basso Continuo	1. Adagio; 2. Vivace; 3. Affettuoso (G minor); 4. Allegro	—	Telemann Portal; Catalogue TWV
TWV 42	TWV 42:c6	Sonata	C minor	flute, viola da gamba and basso continuo	1. Andante; 2. Allemande; 3. Menuet; 4. Aria. Largo; 5. Gigue; 6. Réjouissance. Presto	—	Telemann Portal; Catalogue TWV
TWV 42	TWV 42:c7	Sonata	C minor	oboe, flute and basso continuo	1. Adagio; 2. Allegro; 3. Adagio (E♭ major); 4. Allegro	—	Telemann Portal; Catalogue TWV
TWV 42	TWV 42:c8	Sonata	C minor	2 violins and basso continuo	1. Affettuoso; 2. Allegro; 3. Largo (E♭ major); 4. Allegro	—	Telemann Portal; Catalogue TWV
TWV 42	TWV 42:d1	Trio	D minor	2 flutes / violins and basso continuo Trio	1. Allegro; 2. Largo; 3. Allegro	# 3 from Trietti methodichi e Scherzi	Telemann Portal; Catalogue TWV
TWV 42	TWV 42:d2	Sonata	D minor	2 violins / flutes and basso continuo	1. Vivace; 2. Largo; 3. Presto	# 4 from 6 Trio a Violini e Basso	Telemann Portal; Catalogue TWV
TWV 42	TWV 42:d3	Suite	D minor	flute, harpsichord / violin and basso continuo Suite	1. Dolce / Allegro; 2. Vivace; 3. Allegro; 4. Andante; 5. Presto; 6. Moderato; 7. Vivace	# 6 from 6 Concerts et 6 Suites	Telemann Portal; Catalogue TWV
TWV 42	TWV 42:d4	Trio	D minor	flute, oboe and basso continuo	1. Largo; 2. Allegro; 3. Affettuoso (G minor); 4. Presto	# 22 from Essercizii Musici overo Dodeci Soli e Dodeci Trii à diversi stromenti	Telemann Portal; Catalogue TWV
TWV 42	TWV 42:d5	Sonata	D minor	2 flutes / violins / other instruments and basso continuo	1. Largo; 2. Vivace; 3. Grave (A minor); 4. Allegro	# 1 from Sonates en trio	Telemann Portal; Catalogue TWV
TWV 42	TWV 42:d6	Sonata	D minor	2 violins (scordatura) and basso continuo	1. Grave; 2. Vivace; 3. Grave; 4. Presto	—	Telemann Portal; Catalogue TWV
TWV 42	TWV 42:d7	Sonata	D minor	recorder, viola da gamba and basso continuo	1. Andante; 2. Vivace; 3. Adagio (G minor); 4. Allegro	—	Telemann Portal; Catalogue TWV
TWV 42	TWV 42:d8	Sonata	D minor	2 violins and basso continuo	1. Con affetto 2. Allegro; 3. Grave (G minor); 4. Vivace	—	Telemann Portal; Catalogue TWV
TWV 42	TWV 42:d9	Trio	D minor	2 violins and basso continuo	1. Spirituoso; 2. Allegro; 3. Adagio (F major); 4. Presto	—	Telemann Portal; Catalogue TWV
TWV 42	TWV 42:d10	Sonata	D minor	recorder, violin and basso continuo	1. Allegro; 2. Adagio; 3. Allegro; 4. Presto	—	Telemann Portal; Catalogue TWV
TWV 42	TWV 42:d11	Sonata	D minor	2 instruments and basso continuo	1. Gravement; 2. Menuet; 3. Lentement; 4. Gayement	—	Telemann Portal; Catalogue TWV
TWV 42	TWV 42:e1	Sonata	E minor	2 violins / flutes and basso continuo	1. Largo; 2. Allegro; 3. Affettuoso (G major); 4. Vivace	# 5 from 6 Trio a Violini e Basso	Telemann Portal; Catalogue TWV
TWV 42	TWV 42:e2	Trio	E minor	flute, oboe and basso continuo	1. Affettuoso; 2. Allegro; 3. Dolce (E major); 4. Vivace	# 4 from Musique de table II	Telemann Portal; Catalogue TWV
TWV 42	TWV 42:e3	Concerto	E minor	flute, harpsichord / violin and basso continuo	1. Largo; 2. Vivace; 3. Dolce (G major); 4. Vivace	# 4 from 6 Concerts et 6 Suites	Telemann Portal; Catalogue TWV
TWV 42	TWV 42:e4	Scherzo	E minor	violin, viola and basso continuo	1. Introduzione. Allegro; 2. Allegro; 3. Vivace; 4. Spirituoso; 5. Largo; 6. Presto; 7. Allegro	# 5 from Scherzi melodichi per divertimento di coloro / Pyrmonter Kurwoche, 5.	Telemann Portal; Catalogue TWV
TWV 42	TWV 42:e5	Sonatina	E minor	viola da gamba, oboe and basso continuo	1. No title 2. Vivace; 3. Grave (A minor); 4. Vivace	—	Telemann Portal; Catalogue TWV
TWV 42	TWV 42:e6	Sonata	E minor	flute, oboe and basso continuo	1. Affettuoso; 2. Allegro; 3. Grave (G major); 4. Allegro	—	Telemann Portal; Catalogue TWV
TWV 42	TWV 42:e7	Sonata	E minor	flute, violin and basso continuo	1. Largo; 2. Allegro; 3. Largo (A minor); 4. Allegro	—	Telemann Portal; Catalogue TWV
TWV 42	TWV 42:e8	Sonata	E minor / G minor	2 violins and basso continuo (E minor) / 2 recorders and basso continuo (G minor)	1. Affettuoso; 2. Vivace; 3. Andante (G major); 4. Presto	—	Telemann Portal; Catalogue TWV
TWV 42	TWV 42:e9	Sonata	E minor	flute, oboe and basso continuo	1. Largo; 2. Allegro; 3. Affettuoso (G major); 4. Vivace	—	Telemann Portal; Catalogue TWV
TWV 42	TWV 42:e10	Sonata	E minor	flute, violin and basso continuo	1. Largo; 2. Vivace; 3. Andante (G major); 4. Allegro	—	Telemann Portal; Catalogue TWV
TWV 42	TWV 42:e11	Sonata	E minor	2 violins and basso continuo	1. Tendrement; 2. Viste Gay; 3. Grave; 4. Allègrement	—	Telemann Portal; Catalogue TWV
TWV 42	TWV 42:e12	Sonata	E minor	2 violins and basso continuo	1. Adagio; 2. Allegro; 3. Adagio (G major); 4. Presto	—	Telemann Portal; Catalogue TWV
TWV 42	TWV 42:e13	Sonata	E minor	2 flutes and basso continuo	1. Allegro; 2. Andante; 3. Menuet; 4. Il Maestro e il Discipolo. Canone	—	Telemann Portal; Catalogue TWV
TWV 42	TWV 42:e14	Sonata	E minor	2 flutes and basso continuo	—	—	Telemann Portal; Catalogue TWV
TWV 42	TWV 42:f1	Sonata	F minor	2 flutes / violins / other instruments and basso continuo	1. Cantabile; 2. Allegro assai 3. Andante (F major); 4. Presto	—	Telemann Portal; Catalogue TWV
TWV 42	TWV 42:f2	Sonata	F minor	flute, violin and basso continuo	1. Adagio; 2. Allegro; 3. No title (A♭ major); 4. Allegro	—	Telemann Portal; Catalogue TWV
TWV 42	TWV 42:fis1	Sonata	F♯ minor	2 flutes and basso continuo	1. Allegro; 2. Andante; 3. Menuetto Passionato; 4. Canone	Basso continuo part missing	Telemann Portal; Catalogue TWV
TWV 42	TWV 42:g1	Trio	G minor	—	1. Adagio; 2. Vivace; 3. Adagio (B♭ major); 4. Allegro	# 5 from 6 Trios	Telemann Portal; Catalogue TWV
TWV 42	TWV 42:g2	Concerto	G minor	flute, harpsichord / violin and basso continuo Konzert	1. Largo; 2. Vivace; 3. Soave (B♭ major); 4. Allegro	# 2 from 6 Concerts et 6 Suites	Telemann Portal; Catalogue TWV
TWV 42	TWV 42:g3	Scherzo	G minor	violin, viola and basso continuo	1. Introduzione. Vivace; 2. Presto; 3. Dolce; 4. Allegro; 5. Vivace; 6. Allegro; 7. Vivace	# 6 from Scherzi melodichi per divertimento di coloro / Pyrmonter Kurwoche 6. Sonnabend	Telemann Portal; Catalogue TWV
TWV 42	TWV 42:g4	Sonata	G minor	2 violins / flutes and basso continuo	1. Grave; 2. Vivace; 3. Presto; 4. Grave (B♭ major); 5. Vivace	# 5 from Sonates Corellisantes	Telemann Portal; Catalogue TWV
TWV 42	TWV 42:g5	Trio	G minor	violin, oboe and basso continuo	1. Mesto; 2. Allegro; 3. Andante (B♭ major); 4. Vivace	# 6 from Essercizii Musici overo Dodeci Soli e Dodeci Trii a diversi stromenti	Telemann Portal; Catalogue TWV
TWV 42	TWV 42:g6	Sonata	G minor	Oboe, viola da gamba and basso continuo	1. Largo; 2. Vivace; 3. Andante (B♭ major); 4. Presto	—	Telemann Portal; Catalogue TWV
TWV 42	TWV 42:g7	Sonata	G minor	flute, viola da gamba and basso continuo	1. Siciliana; 2. Allegro; 3. Adagio; 4. Allegro assai	—	Telemann Portal; Catalogue TWV
TWV 42	TWV 42:g8	Sonata	G minor	Oboe, violin and basso continuo	1. Andante; 2. Allegro; 3. Adagio; 4. Presto	—	Telemann Portal; Catalogue TWV
TWV 42	TWV 42:g9	Sonata	G minor	recorder, viola da gamba and basso continuo	1. Soave ma non adagio 2. Vivace; 3. Largo (B♭ major); 4. Allegro	—	Telemann Portal; Catalogue TWV
TWV 42	TWV 42:g10	Sonata	G minor	violin, viola da gamba and basso continuo	1. Cantabile; 2. Allegro; 3. Largo (B♭ major); 4. Vivace	—	Telemann Portal; Catalogue TWV
TWV 42	TWV 42:g11	Sonata	G minor	violin, viola da gamba and basso continuo	1. Cantabile; 2. Vivace; 3. Dolce (B♭ major); 4. Allegro	—	Telemann Portal; Catalogue TWV
TWV 42	TWV 42:g12	Sonata	G minor	violin, oboe and basso continuo	1. Allegro; 2. Largo; 3. Allegro	—	Telemann Portal; Catalogue TWV
TWV 42	TWV 42:g13	Sonata	G minor	flute, violin / 2 violins and basso continuo	1. Adagio; 2. Allegro; 3. Adagio (C minor); 4. Allegro	—	Telemann Portal; Catalogue TWV
TWV 42	TWV 42:g14	Sonata	G minor	violin, oboe and basso continuo	1. Adagio; 2. Allegro; 3. Adagio; 4. Vivace	—	Telemann Portal; Catalogue TWV
TWV 42	TWV 42:g15	Sonata	G minor	flute, viola da gamba and basso continuo	1. Vivace; 2. Cantabile (B♭ major); 3. Vivace	—	Telemann Portal; Catalogue TWV
TWV 42	TWV 42:h1	Concerto	B minor	flute, harpsichord and Konzert basso continuo	1. Adagio; 2. Vivace; 3. Gratioso (E minor); 4. Presto	# 5 from 6 Concerts et 6 Suites	Telemann Portal; Catalogue TWV
TWV 42	TWV 42:h2	Suite	B minor	flute, harpsichord / violin and basso continuo Suite	1. Soave / Allegro; 2. Tempo di Menuet I / Tempo di Menuet II; 3. Vivace; 4. Presto; 5. Vivace; 6. Allegro; 7. Allegro	# 3 from 6 Concerts et 6 Suites	Telemann Portal; Catalogue TWV
TWV 42	TWV 42:h3	Sonata	B minor	2 violins / flutes and basso continuo	1. Grave; 2. Vivace; 3. Adagio e staccato 4. Allegro assai (D major); 5. Soave; 6. Presto	# 3 from Sonates Corellisantes	Telemann Portal; Catalogue TWV
TWV 42	TWV 42:h4	Trio	B minor	flute, viola da gamba and basso continuo	1. Largo; 2. Vivace; 3. Dolce (D major); 4. Vivace	# 12 from Essercizii Musici overo Dodeci Soli e Dodeci Trii a diversi stromenti	Telemann Portal; Catalogue TWV
TWV 42	TWV 42:h5	Sonata	B minor	2 violins and basso continuo	1. Tendrement; 2. Allègrement; 3. Chandan; 4. Allègrement	—	Telemann Portal; Catalogue TWV
TWV 42	TWV 42:h6	Sonata	B minor	violin, viola da gamba and basso continuo	1. Largo; 2. Vivace; 3. Andante (F♯ minor); 4. Allegro	—	Telemann Portal; Catalogue TWV
TWV 42	TWV 42:h7	Trio	B minor	2 violins and basso continuo	1. Andante; 2. Presto; 3. Grave; 4. Spiritato	—	Telemann Portal; Catalogue TWV
TWV 42	TWV Anh. 42:A1	Concerto	A major	2 violins (scodatura) and basse continue	—	Quartet TWV 43:A7, without flute part	Telemann Portal; Catalogue TWV
TWV 42	TWV Anh. 42:C1	Suite	C major	2 flutes and basso continuo	1. Ouverture; 2. Rondeau; 3. Bourrée; 4. Trio	—	Catalogue TWV
TWV 42	TWV Anh. 42:C2	Intrada	C major	2 flutes and basso continuo	1. Intrade; 2. Adagio (A minor)	—	Catalogue TWV
TWV 42	TWV Anh. 42:C3	Suite	C major	2 flutes and basso continuo	1. Concerto; 2. Trio; 3. Gavotte; 4. Bourrée	—	Catalogue TWV
TWV 42	TWV Anh. 42:C4	Allemande	C major	2 instruments and basso continuo	1. Allegro	—	Catalogue TWV
TWV 42	TWV Anh. 42:C5	Duet	C major	2 instruments and basso continuo	1. Allegro; 2. Adagio	—	Catalogue TWV
TWV 42	TWV Anh. 42:F1	Concerto	F major	2 oboes and basso continuo	1. Largo; 2. Allegro; 3. Adagio (D minor); 4. Allegro	—	Catalogue TWV
TWV 42	TWV Anh. 42:F2	Cantate	F major	2 instruments and basso continuo	1. Cantate	—	Catalogue TWV
TWV 42	TWV Anh. 42:F3	Concerto	F major	violin, natural horn, and basso continuo	—	= TWV 43:F6	Telemann Portal; Catalogue TWV
TWV 42	TWV Anh. 42:F4	Trio	F major	2 chalumeaux / violettes and basso continuo	—	= TWV 44:6	Telemann Portal; Catalogue TWV
TWV 42	TWV Anh. 42:e1	Sonata	E minor	2 violins and basse continue	—	3rd and 4th movements of TWV 42:E4	Telemann Portal; Catalogue TWV
TWV 42	TWV Anh. 42:g1	Cantate	G minor	oboe, violin and basso continuo Aria 1 and 2 of the cantata	1. Cantata; 2. Aria	—	Telemann Portal; Catalogue TWV

=== TWV 43 – Chamber music for 3 instruments with basso continuo ===
Section	Grouping	Catalogue	Title	Key	Scoring	Movements	Observation	URL
TWV 43	Paris quartets	TWV 43:A1	Quartet	A major	flute, violin, viola da gamba/cello and basso continuo	1. Soave; 2. Allegro; 3. Andante (A minor); 4. Vivace	# 3 (Sonate # 1) de Quadri	Telemann Portal; Catalogue TWV
TWV 43	—	TWV 43:A2	Quartet	A major	2 flutes / violins and 2 cellos / bassoons (2nd cello = basso continuo) or 2 flutes / violins and cello / bassoon	1. Vivace; 2. Largo (F♯ minor); 3. Allegro	# 3 from 6 Quatuors ou Trios	Telemann Portal; Catalogue TWV
TWV 43	Paris quartets	TWV 43:A3	Quartet	A major	flute, violin, viola da gamba/cello and basso continuo	1. Prélude. Vivement; 2. Gai; 3. Modéré; 4. Modéré; 5. Pas vite 6. Un peu gai	# 5 from Nouveaux Quatuors en 6 Suites	Telemann Portal; Catalogue TWV
TWV 43	—	TWV 43:A4	Quartet	A major	flute, violin, viola and basso continuo	1. Adagio; 2. Allegro; 3. Adagio (F♯ minor); 4. Allegro	# 3 from 4è livre de Quatuors	Telemann Portal; Catalogue TWV
TWV 43	—	TWV 43:A5	Quartet	A major	2 violins, viola and basso continuo	1. Allegro; 2. Largo (F♯ minor); 3. Presto	—	Telemann Portal; Catalogue TWV
TWV 43	—	TWV 43:A6	Quartet	A major	2 violins, viola and basso continuo	1. Gratioso; 2. Allegro; 3. Largo (F♯ minor); 4. Vivace	—	Telemann Portal; Catalogue TWV
TWV 43	—	TWV 43:A7	Quartet	A major	flute, 2 violins and basso continuo	1. Largo; 2. Vivace; 3. Aria en Menuet; 4. Bourrée I 5. Bourrée II	—	Telemann Portal; Catalogue TWV
TWV 43	—	TWV 43:B1	Quartet	B♭ major	2 violins, viola and basso continuo	1. Allegro; 2. Adagio (F major); 3. Vivace	—	Telemann Portal; Catalogue TWV
TWV 43	—	TWV 43:B2	Quartet	B♭ major	2 violins, viola and basso continuo	1. Spirituoso; 2. Grave (G minor); 3. Allegro	—	Telemann Portal; Catalogue TWV
TWV 43	—	TWV 43:B3	Quartet	B♭ major	2 violins, viola and basso continuo	1. Polonoise; 2. Allegro; 3. Largo (G minor); 4. Allegro	—	Telemann Portal; Catalogue TWV
TWV 43	—	TWV 43:C1	Quartet	C major	flute, violin, viola and basso continuo	1. Adagio; 2. Allegro; 3. Adagio (A minor); 4. Allegro	# 1 du 4è livre de Quatuors	Telemann Portal; Catalogue TWV
TWV 43	—	TWV 43:C2	Quartet	C major	flute, viola da gamba, bassoon and basso continuo	1. Grave; 2. Allegro; 3. Largo (A minor); 4. Vivace	—	Telemann Portal; Catalogue TWV
TWV 43	Paris quartets	TWV 43:D1	Quartet	D major	flute, violin, viola da gamba/cello and basso continuo	1. Allegro; 2. Affettuoso (G major); 3. Vivace	# 2 (Concerto # 2) dans Quadri	Telemann Portal; Catalogue TWV
TWV 43	—	TWV 43:D2	Quartet	D major	2 flutes / violins and 2 cellos or bassoon (2nd cello = basso continuo) or 2 flutes / violins and cello or bassoon	1. Dolce; 2. Allegro; 3. Grave (B minor); 4. Allegro	# 1 from Six Quatuors ou Trios	Telemann Portal; Catalogue TWV
TWV 43	Paris quartets	TWV 43:D3	Quartet	D major	flute, violin, viola da gamba and basso continuo	1. Prélude. Vivement; 2. Tendrement (D minor); 3. Vite (D minor); 4. Gayment; 5. Modérément (B minor); 6. Vite	# 1 from Nouveaux Quatuors en 6 Suites	Telemann Portal; Catalogue TWV
TWV 43	—	TWV 43:D4	Quartet	D major	flute, violin, viola and basso continuo	1. Andante; 2. Allegro; 3. Adagio; 4. Allegro	# 1 from 4è livre de Quatuors	Telemann Portal; Catalogue TWV
TWV 43	—	TWV 43:D5	Quartet	D major	2 violins, viola and basso continuo	1. Allemande; 2. Ballo; 3. Giga	—	Telemann Portal; Catalogue TWV
TWV 43	—	TWV 43:D6	Quartet	D major	flute, violin, bassoon/cello and basso continuo	1. Con contento 2. Allegro; 3. Largo (B minor); 4. Presto	—	Telemann Portal; Catalogue TWV
TWV 43	—	TWV 43:D7	Quartet	D major	trumpet, 2 oboes and basso continuo	1. Largo; 2. Vivace; 3. Siciliano; 4. Vivace	—	Telemann Portal; Catalogue TWV
TWV 43	—	TWV 43:D8	Quartet	D major	2 violins, hunting horn and basso continuo	1. Largo; 2. Allegro; 3. Menuet & Trio (D minor); 4. Presto	—	Telemann Portal; Catalogue TWV
TWV 43	—	TWV 43:D9	Ouverture	D major	3 oboes and basso continuo	—	—	Telemann Portal; Catalogue TWV
TWV 43	—	TWV 43:D10	Quartet	D major	oboe, flute, viola, viola da gamba and basso continuo	—	—	Telemann Portal; Catalogue TWV
TWV 43	—	TWV 43:E1	Quartet	E major	2 flutes / violins and 2 cellos / bassoon (2nd cello = basso continuo) or 2 flutes / violins and cello / bassoon	1. Gratioso; 2. Divertimento I. Allegro; 3. Divertimento II. Tempo giusto 4. Divertimento III. Allegro	# 6 from 6 Quatuors ou Trios	Telemann Portal; Catalogue TWV
TWV 43	—	TWV 43:E2	Quartet	E major	2 violins, viola and basso continuo	1. Affettuoso; 2. Allegro; 3. Adagio (C♯ minor); 4. Presto	—	Telemann Portal; Catalogue TWV
TWV 43	—	TWV 43:Es1	Quartet	E♭ major	2 violins, viola and basso continuo	1. Largo; 2. Allegro; 3. Andante (C minor); 4. Allegro	—	Telemann Portal; Catalogue TWV
TWV 43	—	TWV 43:F1	Quartet	F major	flute, violin, viola and basso continuo	1. Adagio; 2. Allegro; 3. Adagio (D minor); 4. Allegro	# 2 from 4è livre de Quatuors	Telemann Portal; Catalogue TWV
TWV 43	—	TWV 43:F2	Quartet	F major	violin, 2 blowtorches and basso continuo	1. No title 2. Allegro; 3. Grave (D minor); 4. Vivace	—	Telemann Portal; Catalogue TWV
TWV 43	—	TWV 43:F3	Quartet	F major	2 violins, viola and basso continuo	1. Vivace; 2. Andante (D minor); 3. Allegro	—	Telemann Portal; Catalogue TWV
TWV 43	—	TWV 43:F4	Quartet	F major	2 violins, viola and basso continuo	1. Largo; 2. Vivace; 3. Siciliana (D minor); 4. Presto	—	Telemann Portal; Catalogue TWV
TWV 43	—	TWV 43:F5	Quartet	F major	2 violins, viola and basso continuo	1. Andante; 2. Allegro; 3. Largo (D minor); 4. Presto	—	Telemann Portal; Catalogue TWV
TWV 43	—	TWV 43:F6	Quartet	F major	violin, hunting horn, cello and basso continuo	1. Concerto; 2. Rigaudon; 3. Passepied; 4. Gigue	—	Telemann Portal; Catalogue TWV
TWV 43	Paris quartets	TWV 43:G1	Quartet	G major	flute, violin, viola da gamba/cello and basso continuo	1. Grave; 2. Largo (E minor); 3. Presto; 4. Allegro	# 1 (Concerto # 1) de Quadri	Telemann Portal; Catalogue TWV
TWV 43	—	TWV 43:G2	Quartet	G major	flute, oboe, violin and basso continuo	1. Largo / Allegro (D major); 2. Vivace; 3. Grave (E minor); 4. Vivace	# 2 from Musique de table I	Telemann Portal; Catalogue TWV
TWV 43	—	TWV 43:G3	Quartet	G major	2 flutes / violins and 2 cellos or bassoons (2nd cello = basso continuo) or 2 flutes / violins and cello / bassoon	1. Largo; 2. Divertimento I. Allegro; 3. Divertimento II. Giocando (E minor); 4. Divertimento III. Allegro	# 4 from 6 Quatuors ou Trios	Telemann Portal; Catalogue TWV
TWV 43	Paris quartets	TWV 43:G4	Quartet	G major	flute, violin, viola da gamba/cello and basso continuo	1. Prélude. Un peu vivement 2. Légèrement; 3. Gracieusement; 4. Vite (E minor); 5. Modéré; 6. Gai; 7. Lentement / Vite	# 3 from Nouveaux Quatuors en 6 Suites	Telemann Portal; Catalogue TWV
TWV 43	—	TWV 43:G5	Quartet	G major	flute, violin, viola and basso continuo	1. Adagio; 2. Allegro; 3. Adagio (E minor); 4. Allegro	# 5 from 4è livre de Quatuors	Telemann Portal; Catalogue TWV
TWV 43	—	TWV 43:G6	Quartet	G major	recorder, oboe, violin and basso continuo	1. Allegro; 2. Grave (E minor); 3. Allegro	—	Telemann Portal; Catalogue TWV
TWV 43	—	TWV 43:G7	Quartet	G major	2 violins, viola and basso continuo	1. Andante; 2. Allegro; 3. Largo; 4. Allegro	—	Telemann Portal; Catalogue TWV
TWV 43	—	TWV 43:G8	Quartet	G major	2 violins, viola and basso continuo	1. Adagio; 2. Vivace; 3. Grave; 4. Allegro ma non presto	—	Telemann Portal; Catalogue TWV
TWV 43	—	TWV 43:G9	Quartet	G major	2 violins, viola and basso continuo	1. Vivace; 2. Largo (E minor); 3. Vivace	—	Telemann Portal; Catalogue TWV
TWV 43	—	TWV 43:G10	Quartet	G major	flute, 2 viola da gamba and basso continuo	1. Vivace; 2. Andante (G minor); 3. Vivace	—	Telemann Portal; Catalogue TWV
TWV 43	—	TWV 43:G11	Quartet	G major	flute, violin, bassoon and basso continuo	1. Affettuoso; 2. Allegro; 3. Adagio (D major); 4. Allegro assai	—	Telemann Portal; Catalogue TWV
TWV 43	—	TWV 43:G12	Quartet	G major	flute, 2 viola da gamba and basso continuo	1. Dolce; 2. Allegro; 3. Soave (E minor); 4. Vivace	—	Telemann Portal; Catalogue TWV
TWV 43	—	TWV 43:G13	Quartet	G major	violin, flute, oboe	1. Moderato; 2. Allegro; 3. Andante (E minor); 4. Vivace	—	Telemann Portal; Catalogue TWV
TWV 43	—	TWV 43:a1	Quartet	A minor	2 flutes / violins and 2 cellos / bassoons (2nd cello = basso continuo)	1. Andante; 2. Divertimento I. Vivace; 3. Divertimento II. Presto; 4. Divertimento III. Allegro	# 5 from 6 Quatuors ou Trios	Telemann Portal; Catalogue TWV
TWV 43	Paris quartets	TWV 43:a2	Quartet	A minor	flute, violin, viola da gamba/cello and basso continuo	1. Allégrement; 2. Flatteusement; 3. Légèrement; 4. Un peu vivement 5. Vite; 6. Coulant	# 2 from Nouveaux Quatuors en 6 Suites	Telemann Portal; Catalogue TWV
TWV 43	—	TWV 43:a3	Quartet	A minor	flute, oboe, violin and basso continuo	1. Adagio; 2. Allegro; 3. Adagio; 4. Vivace	—	Telemann Portal; Catalogue TWV
TWV 43	—	TWV 43:a4	Quartet	A minor	2 violins, viola and basso continuo	1. Allegro; 2. Adagio (C major); 3. Presto	—	Telemann Portal; Catalogue TWV
TWV 43	—	TWV 43:a5	Quartet	A minor	2 violins, viola and basso continuo	1. Grave; 2. Allegro; 3. Allegro; 4. Largo e staccato (E minor); 5. Allegro	—	Telemann Portal; Catalogue TWV
TWV 43	—	TWV 43:a6	Quartet	A minor	2 violins, viola and basso continuo	—	—	Telemann Portal; Catalogue TWV
TWV 43	—	TWV 43:d1	Quartet	D minor	2 flutes, recorder / bassoon / cello and basso continuo	1. Andante; 2. Vivace (G major); 3. Largo (A minor); 4. Allegro	# 2 from Musique de table II	Telemann Portal; Catalogue TWV
TWV 43	—	TWV 43:d2	Quartet	D minor	flute, violin, viola and basso continuo	1. Adagio; 2. Allegro; 3. Adagio (B♭ major); 4. Allegro	# 6 du 4è livre de Quatuors	Telemann Portal; Catalogue TWV
TWV 43	—	TWV 43:d3	Quartet	D minor	flute, violin, bassoon/cello and basso continuo	1. Adagio; 2. Allegro; 3. Largo (F major); 4. Allegro	—	Telemann Portal; Catalogue TWV
TWV 43	Paris quartets	TWV 43:e1	Quartet	E minor	violin, flute, viola da gamba/cello and basso continuo	1. Prélude. Vivement; 2. Rigaudon; 3. Air; 4. Replique; 5. Menuet I 6. Menuet II (C♯ minor); 7. Gigue	# 5 (Suite # 1) de Quadri	Telemann Portal; Catalogue TWV
TWV 43	—	TWV 43:e2	Quartet	E minor	flute, violin, cello and basso continuo	1. Adagio; 2. Allegro; 3. Dolce (C major); 4. Allegro	# 2 from Musique de table III	Telemann Portal; Catalogue TWV
TWV 43	—	TWV 43:e3	Quartet	E minor	2 flutes / violins and 2 cellos (2nd cello = basso continuo) or 2 flutes / violins and cello	1. Largo; 2. Presto; 3. Cantabile (G major); 4. Allegro	# 2 from 6 Quatuors ou Trios	Telemann Portal; Catalogue TWV
TWV 43	Paris quartets	TWV 43:e4	Quartet	E minor	flute, violin, viola da gamba/cello and basso continuo	1. Prélude. À discrétion 2. Gay; 3. Vite; 4. Gracieusement (E major); 5. Distrait; 6. Modéré	# 6 from Nouveaux Quatuors en 6 Suites	Telemann Portal; Catalogue TWV
TWV 43	—	TWV 43:e5	Quartet	E minor	2 violins, viola and basso continuo	1. Vivace; 2. Cantabile Grave (G major); 3. Presto	—	Telemann Portal; Catalogue TWV
TWV 43	Paris quartets	TWV 43:g1	Quartet	G minor	flute, violin, viola da gamba/cello and basso continuo	1. Andante; 2. Allegro; 3. Largo (B♭ major); 4. Allegro	# 4 (Sonate # 2) de Quadri	Telemann Portal; Catalogue TWV
TWV 43	—	TWV 43:g2	Quartet	G minor	oboe, violin, viola da gamba and basso continuo	1. Affettuoso; 2. Vivace; 3. Adagio (F major); 4. Allegro	—	Telemann Portal; Catalogue TWV
TWV 43	—	TWV 43:g3	Quartet	G minor	recorder, 2 violins and basso continuo	1. No title 2. Siciliana; 3. Bourrée; 4. Menuet; 5. Trio	—	Telemann Portal; Catalogue TWV
TWV 43	—	TWV 43:g4	Quartet	G minor	flute, violin, viola and basso continuo	1. Allegro; 2. Adagio (B♭ major); 3. Allegro	—	Telemann Portal; Catalogue TWV
TWV 43	—	TWV 43:g5	Quartet	G minor	oboe, violin, viola and basso continuo	—	—	Telemann Portal; Catalogue TWV
TWV 43	Paris quartets	TWV 43:h1	Quartet	B minor	flute, violin, viola da gamba/cello and basso continuo	1. Prélude. Gaiement; 2. Modérément; 3. Réjouissance; 4. Courante; 5. Passepied	# 6 (Suite # 2) de Quadri	Telemann Portal; Catalogue TWV
TWV 43	Paris quartets	TWV 43:h2	Quartet	B minor	flute, violin, viola da gamba/cello and basso continuo	1. Prélude. Vivement / Flatteusement; 2. Coulant; 3. Gay; 4. Vite; 5. Triste; 6. Menuet. Modéré	# 4 from Nouveaux Quatuors en 6 Suites	Telemann Portal; Catalogue TWV
TWV 43	—	TWV 43:h3	Quartet	B minor	flute, viola da gamba, bassoon and basso continuo	1. Adagio; 2. Vivace; 3. Andante (D major); 4. Presto	—	Telemann Portal; Catalogue TWV
TWV 43	—	TWV Anh. 43:B1	Sonata	B♭ major	3 violins and basso continuo	—	Concerto for solo violin, 2 violins, and basso continuo TWV ?	Telemann Portal; Catalogue TWV
TWV 43	—	TWV Anh. 43:A1	Quartet	A major	2 violins, viola and violone (cello)	—	—	Telemann Portal; Catalogue TWV

=== TWV 44 – Chamber music for 4 or more instruments with basso continuo ===
Section	Catalogue	Title	Key	Scoring	Movements	Observation	URL
TWV 44	TWV 44:1	Quintet	D major	trumpet, violins, viola and basso continuo	1. Spirituoso; 2. Largo (D minor); 3. Vivace	—	Telemann Portal; Catalogue TWV
TWV 44	TWV 44:2	Quintet	D major	2 oboes d'amore, 2 hunting horns and basso continuo	1. Andante; 2. Allegro; 3. Siciliano (A major); 4. Presto	—	Telemann Portal; Catalogue TWV
TWV 44	TWV 44:3	Quintet	D major	2 oboes, 2 horns and basso continuo	1. Ouverture; 2. Siciliano; 3. Paysane; 4. Menuet & Trio; 5. Rigaudon; 6. Trio; 7. Harlequinade	Ouverture TWV 55:D24	Telemann Portal; Catalogue TWV
TWV 44	TWV 44:4	Quintet	D major	2 oboes d'amore, 2 violins and basso continuo	—	—	Telemann Portal; Catalogue TWV
TWV 44	TWV 44:5	Quintet	E minor	2 violins, 2 viols and basso continuo	1. Adagio; 2. Allegro; 3. Grave (G major); 4. Allegro	—	Telemann Portal; Catalogue TWV
TWV 44	TWV 44:6	Quintet	F major	2 blowtorches, 2 violets and basso continuo	1. Ouverture; 2. Menuet; 3. Gavotte; 4. Passepied; 5. Air; 6. Gigue	Ouverture TWV 55:F2	Telemann Portal; Catalogue TWV
TWV 44	TWV 44:7	Quintet	F major	2 hunting horns, 2 violins and basso continuo	1. Ouverture; 2. Sarabande; 3. MenuetBourrée	Ouverture TWV 55:F4	Telemann Portal; Catalogue TWV
TWV 44	TWV 44:8	Quintet	F major	2 oboes/violins, 2 hunting horns and bassoon	1. Ouverture; 2. Chasse; 3. Menuet; 4. La Joye; 5. Sarabande; 6. Loure	Ouverture "La Joie" TWV 55:F5	Telemann Portal; Catalogue TWV
TWV 44	TWV 44:9	Quintet	F major	2 oboes, 2 hunting horns and basso continuo	1. Ouverture; 2. Rondeau; 3. Menuet; 4. Gigue	Ouverture "La Fortune" 55:F8	Telemann Portal; Catalogue TWV
TWV 44	TWV 44:10	Quintet	F major	2 oboes, 2 hunting horns and bassoon	1. Ouverture; 2. Passepied; 3. Sarabande; 4. Rigaudon; 5. Le Plaisir	—	Telemann Portal; Catalogue TWV
TWV 44	TWV 44:11	Quintet	F major	2 violins, 2 viols and basso continuo	1. Affettuoso; 2. Allegro; 3. Adagio (A minor); 4. Presto	—	Telemann Portal; Catalogue TWV
TWV 44	TWV 44:12	Quintet	F major	2 oboes, 2 hunting horns and basso continuo	1. Ouverture; 2. Menuet; 3. Sarabande; 4. Bourrée; 5. Gigue	Ouverture "La Chasse" TWV 55:F9	Telemann Portal; Catalogue TWV
TWV 44	TWV 44:13	Quintet	F major	2 oboes, 2 hunting horns and basso continuo	1. Marche; 2. Aria; 3. Menuet; 4. Gigue; 5. Bourrée; 6. Aria; 7. Menuet I 8. Menuet II	Suite TWV 55:F17	Telemann Portal; Catalogue TWV
TWV 44	TWV 44:14	Quintet	F major	2 oboes d'amore, 2 hunting horns and basso continuo	1. Ouverture; 2. Loure; 3. Les Paysans; 4. Menuet; 5. Passepied; 6. Gigue	Ouverture TWV 55:F18	Telemann Portal; Catalogue TWV
TWV 44	TWV 44:15	Quintet	F major	2 flutes, 2 oboes and basso continuo	1. Allegro; 2. Largo (D minor); 3. Vivace	—	Telemann Portal; Catalogue TWV
TWV 44	TWV 44:16	Quintet	F major	2 oboes, 2 horns and bassoon	1. Ouverture; 2. Le Ris; 3. Les Drôles; 4. Espaniole en Rondeau; 5. Fanfare	—	Telemann Portal; Catalogue TWV
TWV 44	TWV 44:17	Quintet	A minor	2 oboes d'amore, 2 violins and violone	—	—	Telemann Portal; Catalogue TWV
TWV 44	TWV 44:31	Sextet	C minor	oboe, 2 violins, viola, bassoon and basso continuo	1. No title 2. Adagio (E♭ major); 3. Allegro	—	Telemann Portal; Catalogue TWV
TWV 44	TWV 44:32	Sextet	F minor	2 violins, viola viola, tenor viola, cello and basso continuo	1. No title 2. No title 3. Largo (C minor); 4. Presto	—	Telemann Portal; Catalogue TWV
TWV 44	TWV 44:33	Sextet	G minor	2 violins, 2 violas, cello and basso continuo	1. Grave; 2. Allegro; 3. Adagio (E♭ major); 4. Vivace	—	Telemann Portal; Catalogue TWV
TWV 44	TWV 44:34	Sextet	B♭ major	2 violins, 2 violas, cello and basso continuo	1. Adagio; 2. Allegro; 3. Adagio (G minor); 4. Allegro	—	Telemann Portal; Catalogue TWV
TWV 44	TWV 44:35	Sonata	A major	2 violins, 2 violas, cello and basso continuo	—	—	Telemann Portal; Catalogue TWV
TWV 44	TWV 44:41	Septet	F major	2 flutes, 2 oboes, 2 violins and basso continuo	1. Grave; 2. Vivace; 3. Adagio (A minor); 4. Allegro	—	Telemann Portal; Catalogue TWV
TWV 44	TWV 44:42	Septet	A minor	2 flutes, 2 oboes, 2 violins and basso continuo	1. Adagio; 2. Allegro; 3. Affettuoso (C major); 4. Allegro Vivace	—	Telemann Portal; Catalogue TWV
TWV 44	TWV 44:43	Septet	B♭ major	3 oboes, 3 violins and basso continuo	1. Allegro; 2. Largo (C minor); 3. Allegro	—	Telemann Portal; Catalogue TWV

=== TWV 45 – Polish dances from the Rostock manuscript ===
Section	Grouping	Catalogue	Title	Key	Scoring	URL
TWV 45	Polish dances from the Rostock manuscript	TWV 45:1	Danse polonaise	D major	Solo instrument and basso continuo	Telemann Portal; Catalogue TWV
TWV 45	Polish dances from the Rostock manuscript	TWV 45:2	Danse polonaise	B♭ major	Solo instrument and basso continuo	Telemann Portal; Catalogue TWV
TWV 45	Polish dances from the Rostock manuscript	TWV 45:3	Danse polonaise	D minor	Solo instrument and basso continuo	Telemann Portal; Catalogue TWV
TWV 45	Polish dances from the Rostock manuscript	TWV 45:4	Danse polonaise	D major	Solo instrument and basso continuo	Telemann Portal; Catalogue TWV
TWV 45	Polish dances from the Rostock manuscript	TWV 45:5	Danse polonaise	G major	Solo instrument and basso continuo	Telemann Portal; Catalogue TWV
TWV 45	Polish dances from the Rostock manuscript	TWV 45:6	Danse polonaise	G minor	Solo instrument and basso continuo	Telemann Portal; Catalogue TWV
TWV 45	Polish dances from the Rostock manuscript	TWV 45:7	Danse polonaise	G major	Solo instrument and basso continuo	Telemann Portal; Catalogue TWV
TWV 45	Polish dances from the Rostock manuscript	TWV 45:8	Danse polonaise	G major	Solo instrument and basso continuo	Telemann Portal; Catalogue TWV
TWV 45	Polish dances from the Rostock manuscript	TWV 45:9	Danse polonaise	G major	Solo instrument and basso continuo	Telemann Portal; Catalogue TWV
TWV 45	Polish dances from the Rostock manuscript	TWV 45:10	Danse polonaise	G major	Solo instrument and basso continuo	Telemann Portal; Catalogue TWV
TWV 45	Polish dances from the Rostock manuscript	TWV 45:11	Danse polonaise	G major	Solo instrument and basso continuo	Telemann Portal; Catalogue TWV
TWV 45	Polish dances from the Rostock manuscript	TWV 45:12	Danse polonaise	G major	Solo instrument and basso continuo	Telemann Portal; Catalogue TWV
TWV 45	Polish dances from the Rostock manuscript	TWV 45:13	Danse polonaise	A minor	Solo instrument and basso continuo	Telemann Portal; Catalogue TWV
TWV 45	Polish dances from the Rostock manuscript	TWV 45:14	Danse polonaise	D minor	Solo instrument and basso continuo	Telemann Portal; Catalogue TWV
TWV 45	Polish dances from the Rostock manuscript	TWV 45:15	Danse polonaise	D minor	Solo instrument and basso continuo	Telemann Portal; Catalogue TWV
TWV 45	Polish dances from the Rostock manuscript	TWV 45:16	Danse polonaise	A minor	Solo instrument and basso continuo	Telemann Portal; Catalogue TWV
TWV 45	Polish dances from the Rostock manuscript	TWV 45:17	Danse polonaise	A minor	Solo instrument and basso continuo	Telemann Portal; Catalogue TWV
TWV 45	Polish dances from the Rostock manuscript	TWV 45:18	Danse polonaise	A minor	Solo instrument and basso continuo	Telemann Portal; Catalogue TWV
TWV 45	Polish dances from the Rostock manuscript	TWV 45:19	Danse polonaise	A major	Solo instrument and basso continuo	Telemann Portal; Catalogue TWV
TWV 45	Polish dances from the Rostock manuscript	TWV 45:20	Danse polonaise	G minor	Solo instrument and basso continuo	Telemann Portal; Catalogue TWV
TWV 45	Polish dances from the Rostock manuscript	TWV 45:21	Danse polonaise	G major	Solo instrument and basso continuo	Telemann Portal; Catalogue TWV
TWV 45	Polish dances from the Rostock manuscript	TWV 45:22	Danse polonaise	E minor	Solo instrument and basso continuo	Telemann Portal; Catalogue TWV
TWV 45	Polish dances from the Rostock manuscript	TWV 45:23	Danse polonaise	G major	Solo instrument and basso continuo	Telemann Portal; Catalogue TWV
TWV 45	Polish dances from the Rostock manuscript	TWV 45:24	Danse polonaise	D major	Solo instrument and basso continuo	Telemann Portal; Catalogue TWV
TWV 45	Polish dances from the Rostock manuscript	TWV 45:25	Danse polonaise	G major	Solo instrument and basso continuo	Telemann Portal; Catalogue TWV
TWV 45	Polish dances from the Rostock manuscript	TWV 45:26	Danse polonaise	G major	Solo instrument and basso continuo	Telemann Portal; Catalogue TWV
TWV 45	Polish dances from the Rostock manuscript	TWV 45:27	Danse polonaise	B♭ major	Solo instrument and basso continuo	Telemann Portal; Catalogue TWV
TWV 45	Polish dances from the Rostock manuscript	TWV 45:28	Danse polonaise	D minor	Solo instrument and basso continuo	Telemann Portal; Catalogue TWV
TWV 45	Polish dances from the Rostock manuscript	TWV 45:29	Danse polonaise	D major	Solo instrument and basso continuo	Telemann Portal; Catalogue TWV
TWV 45	Polish dances from the Rostock manuscript	TWV 45:30	Danse polonaise	G major	Solo instrument and basso continuo	Telemann Portal; Catalogue TWV
TWV 45	Polish dances from the Rostock manuscript	TWV 45:31	Danse polonaise	B♭ major	Solo instrument and basso continuo	Telemann Portal; Catalogue TWV

=== TWV 50 – Symphonies, divertimenti, marches ===
Section	Grouping	Catalogue	Title	Key	Scoring	Movements	Observation	URL
TWV 50	—	TWV 50:1	Sinfonie	G major	flute and/or piccolo, oboe, chalumeau, 2 violins, viol, 2 solo double basses, and basso continuo	1. Etwas lebhaft 2. Tandelnd (E minor); 3.Presto	—	Telemann Portal; Catalogue TWV
TWV 50	—	TWV 50:2	Symphony	C major	2 oboes, 2 violins, viola, and basso continuo	1. Vivace assai 2. Sarabande (C minor); 3. Bourrée (C minor); 4. Menuet en Rondeau; 5. Loure; 6. Chaconnette; 7. Gigue en Canarie	—	Telemann Portal; Catalogue TWV
TWV 50	—	TWV 50:3	Symphony	F major	solo alto recorder and viola da gamba, 2 oboes, bugle, 3 trombones, 2 violins, viola, and basso continuo	1. Allabreve; 2. Andante; 3. Vivace	—	Telemann Portal; Catalogue TWV
TWV 50	—	TWV 50:4	Symphony	E minor	2 oboes, 2 violins, 2 violas, and basso continuo	1. Gravement; 2. Allabreve; 3. Air; 4. Tendrement; 5. Gay	—	Telemann Portal; Catalogue TWV
TWV 50	—	TWV 50:5	Symphony	E minor	2 flutes, 2 oboes, bassoon, 2 violins, violetta, and basso continuo	1. Allegro; 2. Largo	—	Telemann Portal; Catalogue TWV
TWV 50	—	TWV 50:6	Symphony	B♭ major	—	1. Allegro; 2. Andante (E♭ major); 3. Allegro	—	Telemann Portal; Catalogue TWV
TWV 50	—	TWV 50:7	Symphony	F major	—	1. No title 2. Poco Andante (D minor); 3. Allegro	—	Telemann Portal; Catalogue TWV
TWV 50	—	TWV 50:8	Symphony	—	—	—	—	Telemann Portal; Catalogue TWV
TWV 50	—	TWV 50:9	Conclusion	D major	oboe, trumpet, strings, and basso continuo	1. Allegro; 2. Adagio (B minor); 3. Allegro (reprise)	—	Telemann Portal; Catalogue TWV
TWV 50	—	TWV 50:10	Conclusion	B♭ major	2 oboes, strings, and basso continuo	1. Fusioso	—	Telemann Portal; Catalogue TWV
TWV 50	—	TWV 50:21	Divertimento	E♭ major	2 horns, 2 flutes, strings, and basso continuo	1. Ouverture; 2. Réveille. Vivement; 3. La conversation à la table. Gavotte; 4. Réveille à Chasse; 5. Repas (C minor); 6. Retraite	—	Telemann Portal; Catalogue TWV
TWV 50	—	TWV 50:22	Divertimento	A major	2 violins, viola, and basso continuo	1. Presto; 2. Scherzo I. Gagliardmente; 3. Scherzo II. Poco grave 4. Scherzo III. Poco vivace 5. Scherzo IV. Allegro di molto 6. Scherzo V. Lieto; 7. Scherzo VI. Tempo precedente	—	Telemann Portal; Catalogue TWV
TWV 50	—	TWV 50:23	Divertimento	B♭ major	2 violins, viola, and basso continuo	1. Allegro assai 2. Scherzo I. Vivace; 3. Scherzo II. Alternamente col precedente 4. Scherzo III. Veloce; 5. Scherzo IV. Alternamente col precedente (G minor); 6. Scherzo V. Con giubilo 7. Scherzo VI. Arlechinoso	—	Telemann Portal; Catalogue TWV
TWV 50	12 Marches héroiques ("Heldenmusik")	TWV 50:31	Marche héroique "Die Wurde – La Majesté"	D major	—	—	—	Telemann Portal; Catalogue TWV
TWV 50	12 Marches héroiques ("Heldenmusik")	TWV 50:32	Marche héroique "Die Anmut – La Grâce"	D major	—	—	—	Telemann Portal; Catalogue TWV
TWV 50	12 Marches héroiques ("Heldenmusik")	TWV 50:33	Marche héroique "Die Tapferkeit – La Vaillance"	D major	—	—	—	Telemann Portal; Catalogue TWV
TWV 50	12 Marches héroiques ("Heldenmusik")	TWV 50:34	Marche héroique "Die Ruhe – La Tranquilité"	E♭ major	—	—	—	Telemann Portal; Catalogue TWV
TWV 50	12 Marches héroiques ("Heldenmusik")	TWV 50:35	Marche héroique "Die Rustung – L'Armement"	E♭ major	—	—	—	Telemann Portal; Catalogue TWV
TWV 50	12 Marches héroiques ("Heldenmusik")	TWV 50:36	Marche héroique "Die Liebe – L'Amour"	E♭ major	—	—	—	Telemann Portal; Catalogue TWV
TWV 50	12 Marches héroiques ("Heldenmusik")	TWV 50:37	Marche héroique "Die Wachsamkeit – La Vigilance"	F major	—	—	—	Telemann Portal; Catalogue TWV
TWV 50	12 Marches héroiques ("Heldenmusik")	TWV 50:38	Marche héroique "Die Ausgelassenheit – La Gaillardise"	F major	—	—	—	Telemann Portal; Catalogue TWV
TWV 50	12 Marches héroiques ("Heldenmusik")	TWV 50:39	Marche héroique "Die Sanftmut – La Douceur"	F major	—	—	—	Telemann Portal; Catalogue TWV
TWV 50	12 Marches héroiques ("Heldenmusik")	TWV 50:40	Marche héroique "Die Grossmut – La Générosité"	C major	—	—	—	Telemann Portal; Catalogue TWV
TWV 50	12 Marches héroiques ("Heldenmusik")	TWV 50:41	Marche héroique "Die Hoffnung – L'Espérance"	B♭ major	—	—	—	Telemann Portal; Catalogue TWV
TWV 50	12 Marches héroiques ("Heldenmusik")	TWV 50:42	Marche héroique "Die Freude – La Réjouissance"	G major	—	—	—	Telemann Portal; Catalogue TWV
TWV 50	—	TWV 50:43	Marche	F major	2 horns, 3 oboes, and bassoon	—	—	Telemann Portal; Catalogue TWV
TWV 50	—	TWV 50:44	Fanfare	D major	2 flutes, 2 violins, viola, and basso continuo	—	—	Telemann Portal; Catalogue TWV
TWV 50	—	TWV Anh. 50:1	Symphony	D major	—	1. Die alte Welt. Altdeutsch; 2. Ernsthaft. Munter; 3. Die mittlere Welt. Capellmassig; 4. Die Jungere Welt. Lustig	Celebration of the first centenary of the Hamburg Commercial Deputation	Telemann Portal; Catalogue TWV
TWV 50	—	TWV Anh. 50:2	Symphony	C minor	—	—	Sinfonia of the Brockespassion TVWV 5:1	Telemann Portal; Catalogue TWV
TWV 50	—	TWV Anh. 50:3	Symphony	G minor	—	—	Sinfonia from the opera Hercules et Alceste TWV 21:34	Telemann Portal; Catalogue TWV
TWV 50	—	TWV Anh. 50:4	Symphony	F major	—	—	Sinfonia from the Passionsoratorium "Seliges Erwagen", TVWV 5:2	Telemann Portal; Catalogue TWV
TWV 50	—	TWV Anh. 50:5	Hamburgische Trauermusik	—	—	—	Instrumentation for the funeral music for the Mayor of Hamburg, TVWV 4:2 and TVWV 4:8	Telemann Portal; Catalogue TWV
TWV 50	—	TWV Anh. 50:6	Chaconne	F major	—	—	Penultimate movement of Ouverture 55:f 1	Telemann Portal; Catalogue TWV

=== TWV 51 – Concertos for solo instrument and orchestra ===
Section	Catalogue	Title	Key	Scoring	Movements	Observation	URL
TWV 51	TWV 51:A1	Concerto	A major	Flute d'amour, strings and basso continuo	1. No title	—	Telemann Portal; Catalogue TWV
TWV 51	TWV 51:A2	Concerto	A major	oboe d'amore, strings and basso continuo	1. Siciliano; 2. Allegro; 3. Largo (A minor); 4. Vivace	—	Telemann Portal; Catalogue TWV
TWV 51	TWV 51:A3	Concerto	A major	violin, strings and basso continuo	1. Grave; 2. Vivace; 3. Adagio (F♯ minor); 4. Allegro	—	Telemann Portal; Catalogue TWV
TWV 51	TWV 51:A4	Concerto	A major	violin, strings and basso continuo	1. Allegro; 2. Adagio; 3. Menuet; 4. Alternativement	—	Telemann Portal; Catalogue TWV
TWV 51	TWV 51:A5	Concerto	A major	viola da gamba, strings and basso continuo	1. Soave; 2. Allegro; 3. Adagio (F♯ minor); 4. Allegro	—	Telemann Portal; Catalogue TWV
TWV 51	TWV 51:B1	Concerto	B♭ major	violin, strings and basso continuo	1. Largo; 2. Vivace; 3. No title (E♭ major); 4. Allegro	—	Telemann Portal; Catalogue TWV
TWV 51	TWV 51:B2	Concerto	B♭ major	violin, strings and basso continuo	1. Adagio; 2. Allegro; 3. Grave (D minor); 4. Allegro	—	Telemann Portal; Catalogue TWV
TWV 51	TWV 51:C1	Concerto	C major	recorder, strings and basso continuo	1. Allegretto; 2. Allegro; 3. Andante (A minor); 4.Tempo di Minuet	—	Telemann Portal; Catalogue TWV
TWV 51	TWV 51:C2	Concerto	C major	violin, strings and basso continuo	1. Affectuoso; 2. Allegro; 3. Grave (C minor); 4. Allegro	—	Telemann Portal; Catalogue TWV
TWV 51	TWV 51:C3	Concerto	C major	violin, strings and basso continuo	1. No title 2. Largo (A minor); 3. Vivace	—	Telemann Portal; Catalogue TWV
TWV 51	TWV 51:D1	Concerto	D major	flute, strings and basso continuo	1. Andante; 2. Vivace; 3. Largo (B minor); 4. Allegro	—	Telemann Portal; Catalogue TWV
TWV 51	TWV 51:D2	Concerto	D major	flute, strings and basso continuo	1. Moderato; 2. Allegro; 3. Largo (B minor); 4. Vivace	—	Telemann Portal; Catalogue TWV
TWV 51	TWV 51:D3	Concerto	D major	flute, strings and basso continuo	1. Andante; 2. Allegro; 3. Adagio (B minor); 4. Vivace	—	Telemann Portal; Catalogue TWV
TWV 51	TWV 51:D4	Concerto	D major	flute, strings and basso continuo	1. Napolitano; 2. Allegro; 3. Largo (B minor); 4. Tempo di Menuetto	—	Telemann Portal; Catalogue TWV
TWV 51	TWV 51:D5	Concerto	D major	oboe, strings and basso continuo	1. Gratioso; 2. Vivace; 3. Adagio (B minor); 4. Scherzando	—	Telemann Portal; Catalogue TWV
TWV 51	TWV 51:D6	Concerto	D major	oboe, strings and basso continuo	1. Molto allegro 2. Adagio (B minor); 3. Vivace	—	Telemann Portal; Catalogue TWV
TWV 51	TWV 51:D7	Concerto	D major	Trumpet, strings and basso continuo	1. Adagio; 2. Allegro; 3. Grave (B minor); 4. Allegro	—	Telemann Portal; Catalogue TWV
TWV 51	TWV 51:D8	Concerto	D major	hunting horn, strings and basso continuo	1. Vivace; 2. Largo (B minor); 3. Allegro	—	Telemann Portal; Catalogue TWV
TWV 51	TWV 51:D9	Concerto	D major	violin, strings and basso continuo	1. Con contento 2. Allegro; 3. No title (B minor); 4. Vivace	—	Telemann Portal; Catalogue TWV
TWV 51	TWV 51:D10	Concerto	D major	violin, strings and basso continuo	1. Adagio; 2. Allegro; 3. Grave (B minor); 4. Vivace	—	Telemann Portal; Catalogue TWV
TWV 51	TWV 51:E1	Concerto	E major	flute, strings and basso continuo	1. Dolce e staccato 2. Allabreve; 3. Largo (C♯ minor); 4. Vivace	—	Telemann Portal; Catalogue TWV
TWV 51	TWV 51:E2	Concerto	E major	violin, strings and basso continuo	1. Affettuoso; 2. Allegro assai 3. Cantabile (B major); 4. Allegro	—	Telemann Portal; Catalogue TWV
TWV 51	TWV 51:E3	Concerto	E major	violin, strings and basso continuo	1. Allegro; 2. Adagio; 3. Allegro	—	Telemann Portal; Catalogue TWV
TWV 51	TWV 51:Es1	Concerto	E♭ major	oboe, strings and basso continuo	1. Allegro; 2. Largo (C minor); 3. Allegro	—	Telemann Portal; Catalogue TWV
TWV 51	TWV 51:F1	Concerto	F major	recorder, strings and basso continuo	1. Affettuoso; 2. Allegro; 3. Adagio (D minor); 4. Menuet I 5. Menuet II	—	Telemann Portal; Catalogue TWV
TWV 51	TWV 51:F2	Concerto	F major	violin, strings and basso continuo	1. Vivace; 2. Largo; 3. Presto	—	Telemann Portal; Catalogue TWV
TWV 51	TWV 51:F3	Concerto	F major	violin, strings and basso continuo	1. Adagio; 2. Allegro; 3. Adagio; 4. No title	—	Telemann Portal; Catalogue TWV
TWV 51	TWV 51:F4	Concerto	F major	violin, orchestra (2 flutes, 2 oboes, 2 hunting whirlwinds, timpani, strings) and basso continuo	1. Presto; 2. Corsicana. Un poco grave (D minor); 3. Allegrezza; 4. Scherzo; 5. No title 6. Polacca; 7. Minuetto	—	Telemann Portal; Catalogue TWV
TWV 51	TWV 51:G1	Concerto	G major	flute, strings and basso continuo	1. Andante; 2. Allegro; 3. Adagio; 4. Vivace	—	Telemann Portal; Catalogue TWV
TWV 51	TWV 51:G2	Concerto	G major	flute, strings and basso continuo	1. Andante; 2. Vivace; 3. Adagio (E minor); 4. Allegro	—	Telemann Portal; Catalogue TWV
TWV 51	TWV 51:G3	Concerto	G major	oboe d'amore, strings and basso continuo	1. Soave; 2. Allegro; 3. Adagio (E minor); 4. Vivace	—	Telemann Portal; Catalogue TWV
TWV 51	TWV 51:G4	Concerto	G major	violin, strings and basso continuo	1. Vivace; 2. Largo (E minor); 3. Allegro	—	Telemann Portal; Catalogue TWV
TWV 51	TWV 51:G5	Concerto	G major	violin, strings and basso continuo	1. Andante; 2. Molto allegro 3. Vivace	—	Telemann Portal; Catalogue TWV
TWV 51	TWV 51:G6	Concerto	G major	violin, strings and basso continuo	1. Andante; 2. Allegro; 3. Adagio (E minor); 4. Presto	—	Telemann Portal; Catalogue TWV
TWV 51	TWV 51:G7	Concerto	G major	violin, strings (2 violins or violettas) and basso continuo	1. Andante; 2. Allegro; 3. Siciliana (G minor); 4. Allegro	—	Telemann Portal; Catalogue TWV
TWV 51	TWV 51:G8	Concerto	G major	violin, strings and basso continuo	1. Allegro; 2. Andante; 3. Allegro	—	Telemann Portal; Catalogue TWV
TWV 51	TWV 51:G9	Concerto	G major	viola, strings and basso continuo	1. Largo; 2. Allegro; 3. Andante (E minor); 4. Presto	—	Telemann Portal; Catalogue TWV
TWV 51	TWV 51:a1	Concerto	A minor	violin, strings and basso continuo	1. Adagio; 2. Allegro; 3. Presto	—	Telemann Portal; Catalogue TWV
TWV 51	TWV 51:a2	Concerto	A minor	violin, strings and basso continuo	1. Allegro; 2. Andante (C major); 3. Presto	Overture from "Emma und Eginhard" TWV 21:25	Telemann Portal; Catalogue TWV
TWV 51	TWV 51:c1	Concerto	C minor	oboe, strings and basso continuo	1. Adagio; 2. Allegro; 3. Adagio (E♭ major); 4.Allegro	—	Telemann Portal; Catalogue TWV
TWV 51	TWV 51:c2	Concerto	C minor	oboe, strings and basso continuo	1. Adagio; 2. Allegro; 3. Adagio (E♭ major); 4.Allegro	—	Telemann Portal; Catalogue TWV
TWV 51	TWV 51:d1	Concerto	D minor	oboe, strings and basso continuo	1. Adagio; 2. Allegro; 3. Adagio; 4. Allegro	—	Telemann Portal; Catalogue TWV
TWV 51	TWV 51:d2	Concerto	D minor	oboe, strings and basso continuo	1. Largo; 2. Vivace; 3. Andante (A minor); 4. Allegro	—	Telemann Portal; Catalogue TWV
TWV 51	TWV 51:e1	Concerto	E minor	oboe, strings and basso continuo	1. Andante; 2. Allegro molto 3. Largo; 4. Allegro	—	Telemann Portal; Catalogue TWV
TWV 51	TWV 51:e2	Concerto	E minor	oboe d'amore, strings and basso continuo	1. No title 2. No title 3. No title	—	Telemann Portal; Catalogue TWV
TWV 51	TWV 51:e3	Concerto	E minor	violin, strings and basso continuo	1. Allegro; 2. Soave (G major); 3. Allegro	—	Telemann Portal; Catalogue TWV
TWV 51	TWV 51:f1	Concerto	F minor	oboe, strings and basso continuo	1. Allegro; 2. Largo e piano 3. Vivace	—	Telemann Portal; Catalogue TWV
TWV 51	TWV 51:f2	Concerto	F minor	oboe, strings and basso continuo	1. Allegro; 2. Recitativ accomp.; 3. Vivace	—	Telemann Portal; Catalogue TWV
TWV 51	TWV 51:fis1	Concerto	F♯ minor	violin, strings and basso continuo	1. Adagio; 2. Allegro; 3. Adagio (A major); 4. Allegro	—	Telemann Portal; Catalogue TWV
TWV 51	TWV 51:g1	Concerto	G minor	violin, strings and basso continuo	1. Allegro; 2. Adagio (C minor); 3. Allegro	= TWV Anh. 33:7, BWV 985	Telemann Portal; Catalogue TWV
TWV 51	TWV 51:h1	Concerto	B minor	flute, strings and basso continuo	1. Presto; 2. Largo (D major); 3. No title	—	Telemann Portal; Catalogue TWV
TWV 51	TWV 51:h2	Concerto	B minor	violin, strings and basso continuo	1. Affettuoso; 2. Allegro; 3. Adagio (D major); 4. Vivace	—	Telemann Portal; Catalogue TWV
TWV 51	TWV 51:h3	Concerto	B minor	violin, strings and basso continuo	—	—	Telemann Portal; Catalogue TWV
TWV 51	TWV 51:G6a	Concerto	G major	violin, strings and basso continuo	1. Andante; 2. Allegro; 3. Adagio; 4. Allegro	—	Catalogue TWV
TWV 51	TWV Anh. 51:A1	Concerto	A major	flute, strings and basso continuo	1. Allegro; 2. Siciliano. Pastorella; 3. Allegro	—	Catalogue TWV
TWV 51	TWV Anh. 51:B1	Concerto	B♭ major	violin, strings and basso continuo	1. Allegro; 2. Adagio (F major); 3. Allegro	—	Catalogue TWV
TWV 51	TWV Anh. 51:D1	Concerto	D major	flute, strings and basso continuo	—	—	Catalogue TWV
TWV 51	TWV Anh. 51:G1	Concerto	G major	flute, strings and basso continuo	1. Allegro ma non troppo 2. Adagio (E minor); 3. Allegro	—	Catalogue TWV

=== TWV 52 – Concertos for 2 instruments and orchestra ===
Section	Catalogue	Title	Key	Scoring	Movements	URL
TWV 52	TWV 52:A1	Concerto	A major	oboe d'amore, strings and basso continuo	1. Andante; 2. Vivace; 3. Siciliano; 4. Allegro	Telemann Portal; Catalogue TWV
TWV 52	TWV 52:A2	Concerto	A major	2 violins, strings and basso continuo	1. Vivace; 2. Largo (E major); 3. Allegro	Telemann Portal; Catalogue TWV
TWV 52	TWV 52:A3	Concerto	A major	2 violins, strings and basso continuo	1. No title	Telemann Portal; Catalogue TWV
TWV 52	TWV 52:B1	Concerto	B♭ major	2 recorders, strings and basso continuo	1. Grave; 2. Vivace; 3. Tendrement (G minor); 4. Gayment	Telemann Portal; Catalogue TWV
TWV 52	TWV 52:B2	Concerto	B♭ major	2 violins, strings and basso continuo	—	Telemann Portal; Catalogue TWV
TWV 52	TWV 52:C1	Concerto	C major	2 chalumeaux, 2 bassoons, strings and basso continuo	1. Dolce; 2. Allegro; 3. Largo; 4. Allegro	Telemann Portal; Catalogue TWV
TWV 52	TWV 52:C2	Concerto	C major	2 violins, strings and basso continuo	1. Allegro; 2. Adagio (A minor); 3. Allabreve	Telemann Portal; Catalogue TWV
TWV 52	TWV 52:D1	Concerto	D major	2 horns, strings and basso continuo	1. Largo; 2. Vivace; 3. Affettuoso (E major); 4. Allegro	Telemann Portal; Catalogue TWV
TWV 52	TWV 52:D2	Concerto	D major	2 horns, strings and basso continuo	1. Spirituoso, ma non presto 2. Largo (B minor); 3. Allegro; 4. Largo (B minor); 5. Allegro assai	Telemann Portal; Catalogue TWV
TWV 52	TWV 52:D3	Concerto	D major	2 violins, strings and basso continuo	1. Allegro; 2. Adagio (A major); 3. Vivace; 4. Affettuoso (B minor); 5. Allegro	Telemann Portal; Catalogue TWV
TWV 52	TWV 52:D4	Concerto	D major	2 violins, 2 horns, strings and basso continuo	1. Allegro; 2. Adagio (B minor); 3. Allegro	Telemann Portal; Catalogue TWV
TWV 52	TWV 52:Es1	Concerto	E♭ major	2 horns, strings and basso continuo	1. Allegro; 2. Largo (B♭ major); 3. Vivace	Telemann Portal; Catalogue TWV
TWV 52	TWV 52:F1	Concerto	F major	recorder and bassoon, strings and basso continuo	1. Largo; 2. No title 3. No title (A minor); 4. Allegro	Telemann Portal; Catalogue TWV
TWV 52	TWV 52:F2	Concerto	F major	oboe and violin, strings and basso continuo	1. Largo; 2. Vivace; 3. Andante (D minor)	Telemann Portal; Catalogue TWV
TWV 52	TWV 52:F3	Concerto	F major	2 horns, strings and basso continuo	1. Largo; 2. Allegro; 3. Siciliana; 4. Allegro	Telemann Portal; Catalogue TWV
TWV 52	TWV 52:F4	Concerto	F major	2 horns, strings and basso continuo	1. No title 2. Allegro; 3. Largo (D minor); 4. Vivace	Telemann Portal; Catalogue TWV
TWV 52	TWV 52:F5	Concerto	F major	2 sampogni, violins and basso continuo	1. No title	Telemann Portal; Catalogue TWV
TWV 52	TWV 52:G1	Concerto	G major	2 violins, strings and basso continuo	1. Grave; 2. Vivace; 3. Grave (E minor); 4. Vivace	Telemann Portal; Catalogue TWV
TWV 52	TWV 52:G2	Concerto	G major	2 violins, strings and basso continuo	1. Grave; 2. Allegro; 3. Largo (E minor); 4. Presto	Telemann Portal; Catalogue TWV
TWV 52	TWV 52:G3	Concerto	G major	2 violettas, strings and basso continuo	1. Avec doucor 2. Gay; 3. Largo; 4. Vivement	Telemann Portal; Catalogue TWV
TWV 52	TWV 52:a1	Concerto	A minor	recorder and viola da gamba, strings and basso continuo	1. Grave; 2. Allegro; 3. Dolce (F major); 4. Allegro	Telemann Portal; Catalogue TWV
TWV 52	TWV 52:a2	Concerto	A minor	2 recorders, strings and basso continuo	1. Gravement; 2. Vistement; 3. Largement (C major); 4. Vivement	Telemann Portal; Catalogue TWV
TWV 52	TWV 52:c1	Concerto	C minor	oboe, violin, strings and basso continuo	1. Adagio/Allegro; 2. Adagio (G minor); 3. Allegro	Telemann Portal; Catalogue TWV
TWV 52	TWV 52:d1	Concerto	D minor	2 blowtorches, strings and basso continuo	1. Largo; 2. Allegro; 3. Adagio; 4. No title	Telemann Portal; Catalogue TWV
TWV 52	TWV 52:e1	Concerto	E minor	recorder and flute, strings and basso continuo	1. Largo; 2. Allegro; 3. Largo (E major); 4. Presto	Telemann Portal; Catalogue TWV
TWV 52	TWV 52:e2	Concerto	E minor	2 flutes, strings and basso continuo	1. No title 2. Presto; 3. Cantabile (E major); 4. Minuet	Telemann Portal; Catalogue TWV
TWV 52	TWV 52:e3	Concerto	E minor	flute and violin, strings and basso continuo	1. No title 2. Adagio (G major); 3. Presto; 4. Adagio; 5. Allegro	Telemann Portal; Catalogue TWV
TWV 52	TWV 52:e4	Concerto	E minor	2 violins, strings and basso continuo	1. Andante; 2. Allegro; 3. Adagio (G major); 4. No title	Telemann Portal; Catalogue TWV
TWV 52	TWV 52:g1	Concerto	G minor	2 violins, strings and basso continuo	1. Grave; 2. Allegro; 3. Largo; 4. Vivace	Telemann Portal; Catalogue TWV
TWV 52	TWV Anh. 52:F1	Concerto	F major	recorder, viola da gamba, cornet, 3 trombones, strings and basso continuo	—	Catalogue TWV

=== TWV 53 – Concertos for 3 instruments and orchestra ===
Section	Catalogue	Title	Key	Scoring	Movements	Observation	URL
TWV 53	TWV 53:A1	Concerto	A major	2 flutes and bassoon with strings and basso continuo	1. Grave; 2. Allegro; 3. Adagio (A minor); 4. Vivace	—	Telemann Portal; Catalogue TWV
TWV 53	TWV 53:A2	Concerto	A major	flute, violin and cello with strings and basso continuo	1. Largo; 2. Allegro; 3. Gratioso; 4. Allegro	# 3 from Musique de table I	Telemann Portal; Catalogue TWV
TWV 53	TWV 53:C1	Concerto	C major	2 oboes and bassoon with strings and basso continuo	1. Avec doucor 2. Très vite 3. Tendrement (A minor); 4. Vivement	—	Telemann Portal; Catalogue TWV
TWV 53	TWV 53:D1	Concerto	D major	2 flutes and calchedon or bassoon with strings and basso continuo	1. Grave; 2. Vivement; 3. Largo (B minor); 4. Vivace	—	Telemann Portal; Catalogue TWV
TWV 53	TWV 53:D2	Concerto	D major	2 oboes and trumpet with strings and basso continuo	1. Allegro; 2. Adagio (B minor); 3. Aria; 4. No title 5. Vivace	—	Telemann Portal; Catalogue TWV
TWV 53	TWV 53:D3	Concerto	D major	2 oboes d'amore and cello with strings and basso continuo	1. No title 2. Dolce; 3. Allegro	—	Telemann Portal; Catalogue TWV
TWV 53	TWV 53:D4	Concerto	D major	2 violins and bassoon with strings and basso continuo	1. Andante; 2. No title 3. Adagio; 4. Allegro assai	—	Telemann Portal; Catalogue TWV
TWV 53	TWV 53:D5	Concerto	D major	bugle, violin and cello with strings and basso continuo	1. Vivace; 2. Adagio (B minor); 3. Allegro	—	Telemann Portal; Catalogue TWV
TWV 53	TWV 53:E1	Concerto	E major	flute, oboe d'amore and viola d'amore with strings and basso continuo	1. Andante; 2. Allegro; 3. Siciliana (E minor); 4. Vivace	—	Telemann Portal; Catalogue TWV
TWV 53	TWV 53:F1	Concerto	F major	3 violins with strings and basso continuo	1. Allegro; 2. Largo (D minor); 3. Vivace	# 3 from Musique de table II	Telemann Portal; Catalogue TWV
TWV 53	TWV 53:G1	Concerto	G major	2 flutes and bass with strings and basso continuo	1. No title 2. Allegro; 3. Largo (E minor); 4. Presto	—	Telemann Portal; Catalogue TWV
TWV 53	TWV 53:a1	Concerto	A minor	2 flutes and bass with strings and basso continuo	1. Lentement; 2. No title 3. Loure (A major); 4. No title	—	Telemann Portal; Catalogue TWV
TWV 53	TWV 53:d1	Concerto	D minor	2 oboes and bass with strings and basso continuo	1. Grave; 2. Allegro; 3. Affettuoso; 4. Vivace	—	Telemann Portal; Catalogue TWV
TWV 53	TWV 53:e1	Concerto	E minor	2 flutes and violin with strings and basso continuo	1. Larghetto; 2. No title 3. Largo; 4. Presto	—	Telemann Portal; Catalogue TWV
TWV 53	TWV 53:e2	Concerto	E minor	2 oboes and violin with strings and basso continuo	1. No title 2. Andante (G major); 3. Menuet	—	Telemann Portal; Catalogue TWV
TWV 53	TWV 53:g1	Concerto	G minor	2 oboes and bassoon with strings and basso continuo	1. Grave et détaché 2. Allegro; 3. Loure (D minor); 4. Grave	—	Telemann Portal; Catalogue TWV
TWV 53	TWV 53:h1	Concerto	B minor	2 flutes and calchedon with strings and basso continuo	1. Andante; 2. Vivace; 3. Dolce (D major); 4. Allegro	—	Telemann Portal; Catalogue TWV

=== TWV 54 – Concertos for 4 or more instruments and orchestra ===
Section	Catalogue	Title	Key	Scoring	Movements	URL
TWV 54	TWV 54:A1	Concerto	A major	4 violins with strings and basso continuo	1. Affettuoso; 2. Allegro; 3. Adagio; 4. Allegro	Telemann Portal; Catalogue TWV
TWV 54	TWV 54:B1	Concerto	B♭ major	2 flutes, oboe and violin with strings and basso continuo	1. Largo; 2. Allegro; 3. Dolce (G minor); 4. Allegro	Telemann Portal; Catalogue TWV
TWV 54	TWV 54:B2	Concerto	B♭ major	2 recorders and 2 oboes with strings and basso continuo	1. Andate; 2. Presto; 3. Cantabile (E♭ major); 4. Allegro	Telemann Portal; Catalogue TWV
TWV 54	TWV 54:D1	Concerto	D major	2 flutes, violin and cello with strings and basso continuo	1. Vivace; 2. Siciliana (D minor); 3. Allegro; 4. Gavotte. Presto	Telemann Portal; Catalogue TWV
TWV 54	TWV 54:D2	Concerto	D major	3 horns and violin with strings and basso continuo	1. Allegro; 2. Grave (B minor); 3. Presto	Telemann Portal; Catalogue TWV
TWV 54	TWV 54:D3	Concerto	D major	3 trumpets and timpani with 2 oboes, strings and basso continuo	1. Intrada; 2. Grave; 3. Allegro; 4. Largo (B minor); 5. Vivace	Telemann Portal; Catalogue TWV
TWV 54	TWV 54:D4	Concerto	D major	3 trumpets and timpani with strings and basso continuo	1. Largo; 2. Allegro; 3. Adagio (D minor); 4. Presto	Telemann Portal; Catalogue TWV
TWV 54	TWV 54:Es1	Concerto	E♭ major	2 "trombe selvatiche" and 2 violins with strings and basso continuo	1. Maestoso; 2. Allegro; 3. Grave (C minor); 4. Vivace	Telemann Portal; Catalogue TWV
TWV 54	TWV 54:F1	Concerto	F major	2 horns, violin, recorder with oboe, cello, strings and basso continuo	1. Vivace; 2. Scherzando (D minor); 3. Bourée; 4. Menuet; 5. Loure (D minor); 6. Gigue	Telemann Portal; Catalogue TWV

=== TWV 55 – Orchestral suites ===
Section	Catalogue	Title	Key	Scoring	Movements	Observation	URL
TWV 55	TWV 55:A1	Ouverture	A major	2 ad lib horns, strings and basso continuo	1. Ouverture; 2. Branle; 3. Gaillarde; 4. Sarabande; 5. Réjouissance; 6. Passepied; 7. Canarie	# 2 from 6 Ouvertures à 4 ou 6	Telemann Portal; Catalogue TWV
TWV 55	TWV 55:A2	Ouverture	A major	Strings and basso continuo	1. Ouverture; 2. Les Flots. Modéré; 3. Réjouissance; 4. Rondeau; 5. Fanfare. Très viste 6. 6. Menuet I / Menuet II; 7. Polonoise	—	Telemann Portal; Catalogue TWV
TWV 55	TWV 55:A3	Ouverture	A major	Strings and basso continuo	1. Ouverture; 2. Menuet; 3. Air; 4. Bourrée; 5. Rondeau; 6. Gigue; 7. Angloise; 8. Harlequinade	—	Telemann Portal; Catalogue TWV
TWV 55	TWV 55:A4	Ouverture	A major	violin, strings and basso continuo	1. Ouverture; 2. Divertimento; 3. Le Lusinghe; 4. Minuetta I / Minuetta II. Double; 5. Passa tempo 6. Tempo di Giga	—	Telemann Portal; Catalogue TWV
TWV 55	TWV 55:A5	Ouverture "Festliche Suite"	A major	2 violins and basso continuo	1. Ouverture; 2. Plainte; 3. Plainte; 4. Gavotte I / Gavotte II en Musette; 5. Passepied & Double; 6. Gigue	—	Telemann Portal; Catalogue TWV
TWV 55	TWV 55:A6	Ouverture	A major	Strings and basso continuo	—	= TWV Anh. 55:A1	Telemann Portal; Catalogue TWV
TWV 55	TWV 55:A7	Ouverture	A major	violin, strings and basso continuo	1. Ouverture; 2. Invention I. Modéré (D major); 3. Invention II. Légèrement (F♯ minor); 4.-7. Invention III - VI	Fragment	Telemann Portal; Catalogue TWV
TWV 55	TWV 55:A8	Ouverture	A major	violin, strings and basso continuo	1. Ouverture; 2. Passepied I / Passepied II; 3. Aria I. Un peu gaiement / Aria II; 4. Rondeau; 5. Menuet I / Menuet II; 6. Fanfare. Très vite 7. Air; 8. Gigue	—	Telemann Portal; Catalogue TWV
TWV 55	TWV 55:A9	Ouverture	A major	Strings and basso continuo	1. Ouverture	—	Telemann Portal; Catalogue TWV
TWV 55	TWV 55:A10	Suite	A major	Strings and basso continuo	1. Bourrée; 2. Menuet; 3. Gigue	—	Telemann Portal; Catalogue TWV
TWV 55	TWV 55:B1	Ouverture	B♭ major	2 oboes, strings and basso continuo	1. Ouverture. Lentement / Presto; 2. Bergerie. Un peu vivement 3. Allégresse. Vite; 4. Postillons; 5. Flaterie; 6. Badinage. Très vite 7. Menuet	# 1 from Musique de table III	Telemann Portal; Catalogue TWV
TWV 55	TWV 55:B2	Ouverture	B♭ major	Strings and basso continuo	1. Ouverture; 2. Preludio. Con affetto 3. Aria I. Presto; 4. Aria II. Dolce; 5. Aria III. Vivace; 6. Aria IV. Largo; 7. Aria V. Vivace; 8. Aria VI. Allegro	—	Telemann Portal; Catalogue TWV
TWV 55	TWV 55:B3	Ouverture "Le Sommeil"	B♭ major	Strings and basso continuo	1. Ouverture; 2. La Discrétion; 3. Menuet I / Menuet II; 4. Courante; 5. La Grimace; 6. La Doute; 7. Le Sommeil. Très lentement 8. Mercure	—	Telemann Portal; Catalogue TWV
TWV 55	TWV 55:B4	Ouverture	B♭ major	Strings and basso continuo	1. Ouverture; 2. Air à l'Italien. Vivement; 3. Les Cornes de Visbade; 4. Loure; 5. Marche; 6. Menuet I / Menuet II. Doux; 7. Furie	—	Telemann Portal; Catalogue TWV
TWV 55	TWV 55:B5	Ouverture "Volker-Ouverture"	B♭ major	Strings and basso continuo	1. Ouverture; 2. Menuet I / Menuet II. Doucement; 3. Les Turcs; 4. Les Suisses. Grave (G minor) / Viste (G minor); 5. Les Moscovites; 6. Les Portugais. Grave (G minor) / Viste (G minor); 8. Les Boiteux; 9. Les Courors	—	Telemann Portal; Catalogue TWV
TWV 55	TWV 55:B6	Ouverture	B♭ major	flute, 2 recorders, 2 oboes and bassoon, strings and basso continuo	1. Ouverture; 2. No title 3. No title (A major); 4. No title (D major); 5. No title (C major); 6. Allegro (G minor); 7. No title (F major); 8. Vivace (F major); 9. No title	—	Telemann Portal; Catalogue TWV
TWV 55	TWV 55:B7	Ouverture	B♭ major	2 oboes and bassoon, strings and basso continuo	1. Ouverture; 2. Réjouissance; 3. Loure; 4. Rondeau; 5. Menuet / Trio; 6. Gigue	—	Telemann Portal; Catalogue TWV
TWV 55	TWV 55:B8	Ouverture	B♭ major	Strings and basso continuo	1. Ouverture; 2. Scaramouches; 3. Harlequinade; 4. Colombine. Con Grave; 5. Pierrot. Viste; 6. Menuet I / Menuet II; 7. Mezzetin en Turc	—	Telemann Portal; Catalogue TWV
TWV 55	TWV 55:B9	Ouverture	B♭ major	Strings and basso continuo	1. Ouverture; 2. Courante; 3. Marche; 4. Air. Lentement; 5. Air. Vivace; 6. Menuet	—	Telemann Portal; Catalogue TWV
TWV 55	TWV 55:B10	Ouverture	B♭ major	3 oboes and bassoon, strings and basso continuo	1. Ouverture; 2. Rondeau; 3. Air. Un peu viste 4. Hornpipe; 5. Menuet I / Menuet II; 6. Bourrée; 7. Plainte; 8. Combattans; 9. Passepied I / Passepied II	—	Telemann Portal; Catalogue TWV
TWV 55	TWV 55:B11	Ouverture "La Bourse"	B♭ major	2 oboes, strings and basso continuo	1. Ouverture; 2. Le repos interrompu 3. La guerre en la paix 4. Les Vainquors vaincus 5. La Solitude associée 6. L'Espérance de Mississippi. Vistement	—	Telemann Portal; Catalogue TWV
TWV 55	TWV 55:B12	Ouverture	B♭ major	Strings and basso continuo	1. Ouverture; 2. Courante; 3. Rondeau; 4. Menuet; 5. Furies; 6. Polonoise	—	Telemann Portal; Catalogue TWV
TWV 55	TWV 55:B13	Ouverture	B♭ major	2 oboes, strings and basso continuo	1. Ouverture; 2. Gigue; 3. Gavotte; 4. Menuet / Trio; 5. Plainte (G minor) & Trio; 6. Bourrée; 7. Affettuoso e molto adagio (E♭ major); 8. Passepied / Trio	—	Telemann Portal; Catalogue TWV
TWV 55	TWV 55:B14	Ouverture	B♭ major	Strings and basso continuo	1. Ouverture	Fragment	Telemann Portal; Catalogue TWV
TWV 55	TWV 55:C1	Ouverture	C major	3 violins and basso continuo	1. Ouverture; 2. La Complaisance; 3. L'Indignation. Très vite 4. Menuet I / Menuet II; 5. Loure; 6. Très vite	—	Telemann Portal; Catalogue TWV
TWV 55	TWV 55:C2	Ouverture	C major	oboe, strings and basso continuo	1. Ouverture; 2. Air (C minor); 3. Réjouissance; 4. Entrée; 5. Amener; 6. Rondeau; 7. Les Trompettes	—	Telemann Portal; Catalogue TWV
TWV 55	TWV 55:C3	Ouverture "Wasser"	C major	2 recorders, piccolo, flute, 2 oboes and bassoon, strings and basso continuo	1. Ouverture; 2. Sarabande. Die schlaffende Thetis. Doucement; 3. Bourée. Die erwachende Thetis.; 4. Loure. Der verliebte Neptunus.; 5. Gavotte. Die spielenden Najaden.; 6. Harlequinade. Der schertzende Tritonus.; 7. Der sturmende Aeolus.; 8. Menuet. Der angenehme Zephir.; 9. Gig. Ebbe und Fluth.; 1. Canarie.Die lustigen Bots-Leut.	—	Telemann Portal; Catalogue TWV
TWV 55	TWV 55:C4	Ouverture	C major	2 oboes and bassoon, strings and basso continuo	1. Ouverture; 2. Courante; 3. Les Étudiants gaillards 4. Entrée; 5.Sarabande; 6. Rigaudon & Trio; 7. Menuet I / Menuet II / Menuet III; 8. Allemande; 9. Canarie; 1. Air italien	—	Telemann Portal; Catalogue TWV
TWV 55	TWV 55:C5	Ouverture "La Bouffonne"	C major	Strings and basso continuo	1. Ouverture; 2. Loure; 3. Les Boiteux; 4. Menuet I / Menuet II; 5. Entrée; 6. Pastorelle. Doucement	—	Telemann Portal; Catalogue TWV
TWV 55	TWV 55:C6	Ouverture	C major	3 oboes, strings and basso continuo	1. Ouverture; 2. Harlequinade; 3. Espagnol; 4. Bourrée en Trompette; 5. Sommeille; 6. Rondeau; 7. Menuet I / Menuet II; 8. Gigue	—	Telemann Portal; Catalogue TWV
TWV 55	TWV 55:C7	Ouverture	C major	strings and basso continuo(2 oboes and bassoon = 2 violins and basso continuo)	1. Ouverture; 2. Courante; 3. Menuet; 4. Marche; 5. Angloise; 6. Gigue	—	Telemann Portal; Catalogue TWV
TWV 55	TWV 55:D1	Ouverture	D major	trumpet and oboe, strings and basso continuo	1. Ouverture. Lentement; 2. Air I. Tempo giusto 3. Air II. Vivace; 4. Air III. Presto; 5. Air IV. Allegro	# 1 from Musique de table II (= HWV 309)	Telemann Portal; Catalogue TWV
TWV 55	TWV 55:D2	Ouverture	D major	2 ad lib horns, strings and basso continuo	1. Ouverture; 2. Hornpipe; 3. Entrée; 4. Bourrée; 5. Villanelle; 6. Menuet; 7. Passacaille	# 5 from 6 Ouvertures à 4 ou 6	Telemann Portal; Catalogue TWV
TWV 55	TWV 55:D3	Ouverture	D major	Strings and basso continuo	1. Ouverture; 2. Air en Gavotte; 3. Réjouissance; 4. Menuet I / Menuet II / Menuet III (D minor); 5. Loure; 6. Hanaquoise; 7. Gigue	—	Telemann Portal; Catalogue TWV
TWV 55	TWV 55:D4	Ouverture	D major	2 oboes, bassoon and 2 violins, strings and basso continuo	1. Ouverture; 2. Menuet I / Menuet II. Doucement (D minor); 3. Furies. Très viste 4. Entrée; 5. Passepied I / Passepied II Trio (D minor); 6. Loure (D minor); 7. Canaries; 8. Chaconne; 9. Air. Sérieusement (D minor) / Viste	—	Telemann Portal; Catalogue TWV
TWV 55	TWV 55:D5	Ouverture "La Galante"	D major	Strings and basso continuo	1. Ouverture; 2. Air I. Avec modération 3. Air II. Gayement; 4. Air III. Vistement; 5. Air IV. Sérieusement mais avec cadence 6. Air V. Gayement; 7. Air VI. Vistement; 8. Air VII. Très viste	—	Telemann Portal; Catalogue TWV
TWV 55	TWV 55:D6	Ouverture	D major	Cello / Viola da gamba, strings and basso continuo	1. Ouverture; 2. La Trompette; 3. Sarabande; 4. Rondeau; 5. Bourrée; 6. Courante & Double; 7. Gigue. Presto	—	Telemann Portal; Catalogue TWV
TWV 55	TWV 55:D7	Ouverture	D major	Trumpet, strings and basso continuo	1. Ouverture; 2. Air. Détaché; 3. Rigaudon; 4. Plainte; 5. Furies. Très viste 6. Loure; 7. Trezza; 8. Menuet I / Menuet II. Doucement	—	Telemann Portal; Catalogue TWV
TWV 55	TWV 55:D8	Ouverture	D major	Trumpet, strings and basso continuo	1. Ouverture; 2. Marche; 3. Menuet I / Menuet II; 4. Aria; 5. La Réjouissance; 6. Sarabande; 7. Gigue; 8. Passepied I / Passepied II; 9. Rondeau	—	Telemann Portal; Catalogue TWV
TWV 55	TWV 55:D9	Ouverture	D major	Strings and basso continuo	1. Ouverture; 2. Menuet I / Menuet II; 3. Rigaudon; 4. Loure; 5. Brandle; 6. Sarabande; 7. No title	—	Telemann Portal; Catalogue TWV
TWV 55	TWV 55:D10	Ouverture	D major	Strings and basso continuo	1. Ouverture; 2. Réjouissance; 3. Rondeau; 4. Menuet; 5. Air; 6. Gigue	—	Telemann Portal; Catalogue TWV
TWV 55	TWV 55:D11	Ouverture	D major	Strings and basso continuo	1. Ouverture; 2. Bourrée; 3. Aria. Largo; 4. Gigue; 5. Aria. Affettuoso; 6. Menuet; 7. Rondeaux	—	Telemann Portal; Catalogue TWV
TWV 55	TWV 55:D12	Ouverture	D major	Strings and basso continuo	1. Ouverture; 2. Perpetuum mobile 3. Sarabande; 4. Bourrée; 5. Menuet I / Menuet II; 6. Tourbillon; 7. Gigue	—	Telemann Portal; Catalogue TWV
TWV 55	TWV 55:D13	Ouverture "La Gaillarde"	D major	Strings and basso continuo	1. Ouverture. Largo / Allegro; 2. Sicilienne; 3. Angloise. Vivement; 4. Musette; 5. Batelière; 6. Polonoise; 7. Menuet I / Menuet II	—	Telemann Portal; Catalogue TWV
TWV 55	TWV 55:D14	Ouverture	D major	violin, strings and basso continuo	1. Ouverture; 2. Badinage; 3. Rondeau; 4. Menuet I / Menuet II; 5. Sarabande; 6. Caprice; 7. Gigue	—	Telemann Portal; Catalogue TWV
TWV 55	TWV 55:D15	Ouverture	D major	3 oboes, strings and basso continuo	1. Ouverture; 2. Prélude. Très viste 3. Gigue; 4. Menuet I / Menuet II; 5. Harlequinade; 6. Loure; 7. Rondeau; 8. Réjouissance	—	Telemann Portal; Catalogue TWV
TWV 55	TWV 55:D16	Ouverture "Kleine Suite"	D major	2 violins, 2 viols and basso continuo	1. Ouverture; 2. Rondeau; 3. Loure; 4. Menuet I / Menuet II; 5. Rigaudon	—	Telemann Portal; Catalogue TWV
TWV 55	TWV 55:D17	Ouverture	D major	2 trumpets, strings and basso continuo	1. Ouverture; 2. Les Janissaires; 3. Menuet I / Menuet II; 4. Espagniole; 5. Carillon; 6. À la Trompette; 7. Bourrée	—	Telemann Portal; Catalogue TWV
TWV 55	TWV 55:D18	Ouverture	D major	2 trumpets and timpani, strings and basso continuo	1. Ouverture; 2. Menuet I / Menuet II; 3. Gavotte en Rondeau; 4. Passacaille; 5. Air. Lentement; 6. Les Postillons; 7. Fanfare. Très vite	—	Telemann Portal; Catalogue TWV
TWV 55	TWV 55:D19	Ouverture	D major	2 horns, strings and basso continuo	1. Ouverture; 2. Bourrée; 3. Loure; 4. Rondeau. Légèrement; 5. Écossaise; 6. Menuet & Trio. Doux; 7. Gigue	—	Telemann Portal; Catalogue TWV
TWV 55	TWV 55:D20	Ouverture	D major	Strings and basso continuo	1. Ouverture; 2. Bourrée; 3. Courante	—	Telemann Portal; Catalogue TWV
TWV 55	TWV 55:D21	Ouverture	D major	2 horns and 2 oboes, strings and basso continuo	1. Ouverture; 2. Plainte; 3. Réjouissance. Vivement (B minor); 4. Carillon. Gracieusement; 5. Tintamarre. Légèrement; 6. Loure (D minor); 7. Menuet I / Menuet II	—	Telemann Portal; Catalogue TWV
TWV 55	TWV 55:D22	Ouverture	D major	3 trumpets and timpani, strings and basso continuo	1. Ouverture; 2. Le Podagre. Loure (D minor); 3. Remède expérimente: La Poste et la Dance. Menuet en Rondeau; 4. L'Hypochondre. Sarabande (G minor) / Gigue (G minor); 5. Remède: Souffrance héroïque. Marche; 6. Le Petit-Maître; 7. Remède: Petite-maison. Furie	—	Telemann Portal; Catalogue TWV
TWV 55	TWV 55:D23	Ouverture	D major	2 flutes and bassoon, strings and basso continuo	1. Ouverture; 2. Menuet I / Menuet II. Doux, Viste; 3. Plainte	Flute parts lost	Telemann Portal; Catalogue TWV
TWV 55	TWV 55:D24	Ouverture	D major	2 horns, 2 oboes and bassoon	—	= TWV 44:3	Telemann Portal; Catalogue TWV
TWV 55	TWV 55:D25	Ouverture	D major	3 oboes and basso continuo	—	= TWV 43:D9	Telemann Portal; Catalogue TWV
TWV 55	TWV 55:D26	Ouverture	D major	3 trumpets, timpani, flute and violin, strings and basso continuo	1. Ouverture	—	Telemann Portal; Catalogue TWV
TWV 55	TWV 55:E1	Ouverture	E major	Strings and basso continuo	1. Ouverture; 2. Loure; 3. Marche; 4. Air; 5. Passepied; 6. Angloise; 7. Les Furies; 8. Rigaudon; 9. Menuet I / Menuet II; 10. Hanasky	—	Telemann Portal; Catalogue TWV
TWV 55	TWV 55:E2	Ouverture	E major	oboe d'amore, strings and basso continuo	1. Ouverture; 2. Entrée; 3. Rigaudon I / Rigaudon II; 4.Air; 5. Rondeau hanaquoise 6. Passepied; 7. Harlequinade; 8. Menuet I / Menuet II / Menuet III	—	Telemann Portal; Catalogue TWV
TWV 55	TWV 55:E3	Ouverture	E major	violin, strings and basso continuo	1. Ouverture; 2. Bourrée; 3. Sarabande; 4. Menuet I / Menuet II; 5. Sicilienne; 6. Gigue	—	Telemann Portal; Catalogue TWV
TWV 55	TWV 55:E4	Ouverture	E major	Strings and basso continuo	1. Ouverture; 2. Aria. Allegro; 3. Aria. Allegro; 4. Rondeau; 5. Gavotte. Presto; 6. Menuet & Trio (E minor); 7. Gigue	—	Telemann Portal; Catalogue TWV
TWV 55	TWV 55:Es1	Ouverture	E♭ major	2 ad lib horns, strings and basso continuo	1. Ouverture; 2. La Douceur; 3. Menuet; 4. Les Coureurs; 5. Air; 6. Les Gladiateurs; 7. Les Querelleurs	# 3 from 6 Ouvertures à 4 ou 6	Telemann Portal; Catalogue TWV
TWV 55	TWV 55:Es2	Ouverture	E♭ major	Pastoral flute, strings and basso continuo	1. Ouverture. Pastorelle; 2. Menuet I / Menuet II; 3. Sarabande; 4. Bourrée I en Écho / Bourrée II; 5. Passepied; 6. Gavotte; 7. Gigue	—	Telemann Portal; Catalogue TWV
TWV 55	TWV 55:Es3	Ouverture "La lyra"	E♭ major	Strings and basso continuo	1. Ouverture; 2. Bourrée I / Bourrée II; 3. Gigue; 4. Menuet I / Menuet II. Doucement (A♭ major); 5. La Vielle; 6. Sicilienne; 7. Rondeau	—	Telemann Portal; Catalogue TWV
TWV 55	TWV 55:Es4	Ouverture	E♭ major	Strings and basso continuo	1. Ouverture; 2. Entrée; 3. Menuet I / Menuet II; 4. Loure; 5. Gigue; 6. Bourrée I / Bourrée II; 7. Polonoise; 8. Aria; 9. Passepied I / Passepied II	—	Telemann Portal; Catalogue TWV
TWV 55	TWV 55:Es5	Ouverture	E♭ major	2 oboes, strings and basso continuo	1. Ouverture; 2. Preludio. Affetuoso; 3. Aria I. Presto; 4. Aria II. Vivace; 5. Aria III. Tempo di Ciaconna; 6. Aria IV. Allegro; 7. Aria V. Allegro; 8. Aria VI. Tempo di Minuet	—	Telemann Portal; Catalogue TWV
TWV 55	TWV 55:F1	Ouverture	F major	2 ad lib horns, strings and basso continuo	1. Ouverture; 2. Pastourelle; 3. Rondeau; 4. Gigue; 5. Loure; 6. Menuet; 7. Chaconne	# 1 from 6 Ouvertures à 4 ou 6	Telemann Portal; Catalogue TWV
TWV 55	TWV 55:F2	Ouverture	F major	2 blowtorches, 2 violettas and basso continuo	—	= TWV 44:6	Telemann Portal; Catalogue TWV
TWV 55	TWV 55:F3	Ouverture	F major	2 horns, 2 oboes and bassoon, strings and basso continuo	1. Ouverture; 2. Rondeau; 3. Sarabande. Douce; 4. Menuet I & Trio (D minor); 5. La Badinerie; 6. Gigue; 7. Réjouissance & Trio; 8. Fanfare	—	Telemann Portal; Catalogue TWV
TWV 55	TWV 55:F4	Ouverture	F major	2 horns, 2 violins and basso continuo	—	= TWV 44:7	Telemann Portal; Catalogue TWV
TWV 55	TWV 55:F5	Ouverture	F major	2 horns, 2 oboes / violins and bassoon	—	= TWV 44:8	Telemann Portal; Catalogue TWV
TWV 55	TWV 55:F6	Ouverture	F major	Strings and basso continuo	1. Ouverture; 2. Aria; 3. Rondeau; 4. Marche; 5. Chaconne; 6. Menuet; 7. Air. Viste	—	Telemann Portal; Catalogue TWV
TWV 55	TWV 55:F7	Ouverture	F major	Strings and basso continuo	1. Ouverture; 2.Viste; 3. Menuet; 4. Air. Andante; 5. Gigue. Très viste 6. Caprice. Vistement; 7. Carillon	—	Telemann Portal; Catalogue TWV
TWV 55	TWV 55:F8	Ouverture	F major	2 horns, 2 oboes and bassoon	—	= TWV 44:9	Telemann Portal; Catalogue TWV
TWV 55	TWV 55:F9	Ouverture	F major	2 horns, 2 oboes and bassoon	—	= TWV 44:10	Telemann Portal; Catalogue TWV
TWV 55	TWV 55:F10	Ouverture	F major	Strings and basso continuo	1. Ouverture; 2. Air I 3. Air II; 4. Air III; 5. Air IV; 6. Air V 7. Air VI	—	Telemann Portal; Catalogue TWV
TWV 55	TWV 55:F11	Ouverture	F major	4 horns, 2 oboes, 2 violins and basso continuo	1. Ouverture; 2. Die canonierende Pallas; 3. Das Alster Echo; 4. Die Hamburgischen Glockenspiele; 5. Der Schwanen Gesang (F minor); 6. Der Alster Schaffer Dorff Music; 7. Die concertierenden Frosche und Krahen; 8. Der jauchzende Pan; 9. Der frohlockende Peleus; 10. Der Ruhende Pan; 11. Der Schaffer und Nymphen eilfertiger Abzug	—	Telemann Portal; Catalogue TWV
TWV 55	TWV 55:F12	Ouverture	F major	2 horns, strings and basso continuo	1. Ouverture; 2. No title 3. No title 4. No title 5. Modérément vite 6. Gayment (C major); 7. Vite	—	Telemann Portal; Catalogue TWV
TWV 55	TWV 55:F13	Ouverture	F major	violin, strings and basso continuo	1. Ouverture; 2. Réjouissance; 3. Passepied; 4. Allemande; 5. Courante; 6. Menuet I / Menuet II; 7. Gigue	—	Telemann Portal; Catalogue TWV
TWV 55	TWV 55:F14	Ouverture	F major	oboe or violin I, violin II, viola and basso continuo	1. Ouverture; 2. Passetemps. Vivement; 3. Sarabande; 4. Rigaudon I / Rigaudon II; 5. Rondeau; 6. Polonoise; 7. Chasse; 8. Menuet	—	Telemann Portal; Catalogue TWV
TWV 55	TWV 55:F15	Ouverture	F major	2 horns, 2 oboes and bassoon	—	= TWV 44:12	Telemann Portal; Catalogue TWV
TWV 55	TWV 55:F16	Ouverture	F major	2 horns, strings and basso continuo	1. Ouverture; 2. Courante; 3. Bourrée I / Bourrée II; 4. Loure; 5. Menuet I / Menuet II; 6. Forlane. Très vite 7. La Tempête	—	Telemann Portal; Catalogue TWV
TWV 55	TWV 55:F17	Suite	F major	2 horns, 2 oboes and bassoon	—	= TWV 44:13	Catalogue TWV
TWV 55	TWV 55:F18	Ouverture	F major	2 horns, 2 oboes	—	= TWV 44:14	Telemann Portal; Catalogue TWV
TWV 55	TWV 55:G1	Ouverture	G major	2 oboes, strings and basso continuo	1. Ouverture; 2. Prélude. Vistement; 3. Air. Doucement; 4. Air. Lentement; 5. Air en menuet I / Menuet II; 6. Air en Sarabande (G minor) / Viste (G minor); 7. Entrée; 8. Angloise	—	Telemann Portal; Catalogue TWV
TWV 55	TWV 55:G2	Ouverture "La Bizarre"	G major	Strings and basso continuo	1. Ouverture; 2. Courante; 3. Gavotte en Rondeau; 4. Branle; 5. Sarabande; 6. Fantaisie; 7.Menuet I / Menuet II. Doucement; 8. Rossignol	—	Telemann Portal; Catalogue TWV
TWV 55	TWV 55:G3	Ouverture	G major	Strings and basso continuo	1. Ouverture; 2. Prélude. Vite; 3. Menuet; 4. Bourrée I / Bourrée II (E minor); 5. Loure; 6. Sarabande; 7. Menuet; 8. Chaconne	—	Telemann Portal; Catalogue TWV
TWV 55	TWV 55:G4	Ouverture "Les nations anciennes et modernes"	G major	Strings and basso continuo	1. Ouverture; 2. Menuet I / Menuet II; 3. Les Allemands anciens 4. Les Allemands modernes 5. Les Suédois anciens 6. Les Suédois modernes 7. Les Danois anciens 8. Les Danois modernes 9. Les vieilles femmes	—	Telemann Portal; Catalogue TWV
TWV 55	TWV 55:G5	Ouverture	G major	2 oboes and bassoon, strings and basso continuo	1. Ouverture; 2. Les Augures & Trio (G minor); 3. Rondeau; 4. Entrée; 5. La Joye; 6. Sarabande; 7. Gigue; 8. Gavotte en Rondeau; 9. Plainte; 1. Menuet I / Menuet II / Menuet III	—	Telemann Portal; Catalogue TWV
TWV 55	TWV 55:G6	Ouverture	G major	violin, strings and basso continuo	1. Ouverture; 2. Entrée; 3. Bourrée; 4. Loure. Grave; 5. Rondeau; 6. Menuet I / Menuet II	—	Telemann Portal; Catalogue TWV
TWV 55	TWV 55:G7	Ouverture	G major	violin and 2 oboes, strings and basso continuo	1. Ouverture; 2. Gavotte; 3. Menuet I / Menuet II; 4. Chaconne; 5. Gigue	—	Telemann Portal; Catalogue TWV
TWV 55	TWV 55:G8	Ouverture "La Querelleuse"	G major	Strings and basso continuo	1. Ouverture; 2. Rondeau; 3. Les Combattants; 4. Passetemps; 5. Badinerie; 6. Menuet I / Menuet II	—	Telemann Portal; Catalogue TWV
TWV 55	TWV 55:G9	Ouverture	G major	2 violins, 2 violas and basso continuo	1. Ouverture; 2. Air. Lentement; 3. Gavotte; 4. Courante; 5.Chaconne; 6. Menuet	—	Telemann Portal; Catalogue TWV
TWV 55	TWV 55:G10	Ouverture "Burlesque de Quichotte"	G major	Strings and basso continuo	1. Ouverture; 2. Le Réveil de Quichotte; 3. Son Attaque des Moulins à Vent; 4. Ses Soupirs amoureux après la Princesse Dulcinée; 5. Sanche Panse berné 6. Le Galope de Rosinante; 7. Celui d'Ane de Sanche; 8. Le Couché de Quichotte	—	Telemann Portal; Catalogue TWV
TWV 55	TWV 55:G11	Ouverture	G major	Strings and basso continuo	1. Ouverture; 2. Preludio. Siciliana; 3. Aria I. Allegro; 4. Aria II. Allegro; 5. Aria III. Vivace; 6. Aria IV. Affettuoso; 7. Aria V. Presto; 8. Aria VI. Tempo di Menuet	—	Telemann Portal; Catalogue TWV
TWV 55	TWV 55:G12	Ouverture "Avec la suite burlesque"	G major	Strings and basso continuo	1. Ouverture; 2. Air I 3. Air II; 4. Air III; 5. Air IV; 6. Air V 7. Air VI	—	Telemann Portal; Catalogue TWV
TWV 55	TWV 55:G13	Ouverture	G major	violin, strings and basso continuo	1. Ouverture; 2. Bourrée I / Bourrée II; 3. Loure; 4. Rondeau; 5. Menuet	Lost	Telemann Portal; Catalogue TWV
TWV 55	TWV 55:a1	Ouverture	A minor	2 ad lib horns, strings and basso continuo	1. Ouverture; 2. Rondeau; 3. Gavotte; 4. Courante; 5. Rigaudon; 6. Forlane (C major); 7. Menuet I / Menuet II (A major)	# 4 from 6 Ouvertures à 4 ou 6	Telemann Portal; Catalogue TWV
TWV 55	TWV 55:a2	Ouverture	A minor	recorder, strings and basso continuo	1. Ouverture; 2. Les Plaisirs I et II; 3. Air à l'Italien. Largo; 4. Menuet I / Menuet II; 5. Réjouissance. Viste; 6. Passepied I / Passepied II (A major); 7. Polonoise	—	Telemann Portal; Catalogue TWV
TWV 55	TWV 55:a3	Ouverture	A minor	2 oboes and bassoon, strings and basso continuo	1. Ouverture; 2. Les Plaisirs; 3. Loure; 4. Furies; 5. Rigaudon en Rondeau I / Rigaudon II / Rigaudon III (A major); 6. Menuet; 7. Les Matelots; 8. Gigue angloise 9. Rondeau; 10. Hornpipe	—	Telemann Portal; Catalogue TWV
TWV 55	TWV 55:a4	Ouverture	A minor	2 recorders and 2 oboes, strings and basso continuo	1. Ouverture; 2. Passepied & Trio; 3. Bourrée; 4. Menuet & Trio (A major); 5. Rondeau; 6. Polonoise; 7. Gigue	—	Telemann Portal; Catalogue TWV
TWV 55	TWV 55:a5	Ouverture	A minor	Strings and basso continuo	1. Ouverture; 2. Entrée; 3. No title 4. Rondeau; 5. Chaconne; 6. No title 7. Air; 8. Menuet I / Menuet II. Doux	—	Telemann Portal; Catalogue TWV
TWV 55	TWV 55:a6	Ouverture	A minor	2 oboes, strings and basso continuo	1. Ouverture; 2. Loure; 3. Bourrée; 4. Rondeau; 5. La Réjouissance; 6. Menuet I / Menuet II	—	Telemann Portal; Catalogue TWV
TWV 55	TWV 55:a7	Ouverture	A minor	Strings and basso continuo	1. Ouverture; 2. Réjouissance; 3. Aria; 4. Rigaudon; 5. Menuet / Trio (A major); 6. Harlequinade (A major)	—	Telemann Portal; Catalogue TWV
TWV 55	TWV 55:c1	Ouverture	C minor	Strings and basso continuo	1. Ouverture; 2. Courante; 3. Gavotte; 4. Loure; 5. Rondeau; 6. Menuet I / Menuet II / Menuet III; 7. Gigue	—	Telemann Portal; Catalogue TWV
TWV 55	TWV 55:c2	Ouverture	C minor	2 oboes, strings and basso continuo	1. Ouverture; 2. Air. Vivement; 3. Rondeaux; 4. Fugue. Vivement; 5. Gavotte I / Gavotte II; 6. Menuet I / Menuet II; 7. Gigue	—	Telemann Portal; Catalogue TWV
TWV 55	TWV 55:c3	Ouverture	C minor	Strings and basso continuo	1. Ouverture; 2. Prélude. Adagio; 3. Aria I. Presto; 4. Aria II. Vivace; 5. Aria III. Vivace; 6. Aria IV. Allegro; 7. Aria V. Allegro; 8. Aria VI. Presto	—	Telemann Portal; Catalogue TWV
TWV 55	TWV 55:c4	Ouverture	C minor	2 oboes and violin, strings and basso continuo	1. Ouverture	—	Telemann Portal; Catalogue TWV
TWV 55	TWV 55:d1	Ouverture	D minor	Strings and basso continuo	1. Ouverture; 2. Passepied I / Passepied II. Doucement (D major); 3. Entrée. Viste; 4. Loure; 5. Rondeaux	—	Telemann Portal; Catalogue TWV
TWV 55	TWV 55:d2	Ouverture	D minor	Strings and basso continuo	1. Ouverture; 2. Rondeau; 3. Irlandoise; 4. Réjouissance; 5. Sarabande; 6. Les Scaramouches; 7. Menuet I / Menuet II. Doucement; 8. Entrée	—	Telemann Portal; Catalogue TWV
TWV 55	TWV 55:d3	Ouverture	D minor	3 oboes and bassoon, strings and basso continuo	1. Ouverture; 2. Menuet I / Menuet II (D major); 3. Gavotte; 4. Courante; 5. Air; 6. Loure; 7. Hornpipe; 8. Canaries; 9. Gigue	—	Telemann Portal; Catalogue TWV
TWV 55	TWV 55:e1	Ouverture	E minor	2 flutes, strings and basso continuo	1. Ouverture. Lentement / Vite; 2. Réjouissance; 3. Rondeau; 4. Loure; 5. Passepied; 6. Air. Un peu vivement 7. Gigue	# 1 from Musique de table I	Telemann Portal; Catalogue TWV
TWV 55	TWV 55:e2	Ouverture	E minor	Strings and basso continuo	1. Ouverture; 2. Rondeaux; 3. Bourrée; 4. Menuet I / Menuet II (E major); 5. Gigue	—	Telemann Portal; Catalogue TWV
TWV 55	TWV 55:e3	Ouverture	E minor	2 flutes, 2 oboes, bassoon and 2 violins, strings and basso continuo	1. Ouverture; 2. Les Cyclopes; 3. Menuet & Trio (G major); 4. Galimatias en Rondeau; 5. Hornpipe	—	Telemann Portal; Catalogue TWV
TWV 55	TWV 55:e4	Ouverture	E minor	Strings and basso continuo	1. Ouverture; 2. Rigaudon; 3. La Discrétion; 4. La Querelle; 5. Menuet I / Menuet II; 6. Rondeau; 7. Passepied I / Passepied II; 8. Passacaille	—	Telemann Portal; Catalogue TWV
TWV 55	TWV 55:e5	Ouverture	E minor	Strings and basso continuo	1. Ouverture; 2. Réjouissance; 3. Air; 4. Gigue; 5. Menuet & Trio; 6. Forlane	—	Telemann Portal; Catalogue TWV
TWV 55	TWV 55:e6	Ouverture	E minor	2 oboes, strings and basso continuo	1. Ouverture; 2. Preludio; 3. Aria I 4. Aria II; 5. Aria III; 6. Aria IV; 7. Aria V 8. Aria VI	—	Telemann Portal; Catalogue TWV
TWV 55	TWV 55:e7	Ouverture "L'Omphale"	E minor	Strings and basso continuo	1. Ouverture; 2. Le Contentement; 3. Gavotte; 4. Loure; 5. Menuet; 6. Rondeau; 7. Canarie. Très viste	—	Telemann Portal; Catalogue TWV
TWV 55	TWV 55:e8	Ouverture	E minor	Strings and basso continuo	1. Ouverture; 2. Pastorale (G major); 3. Bourrée; 4. Passepied (E major); 5. Les Jeux. Vite; 6. Les Magiciens. Gravement; 7. Menuet en Rondeau	—	Telemann Portal; Catalogue TWV
TWV 55	TWV 55:e9	Ouverture	E minor	Strings and basso continuo	1. Ouverture; 2. Gavotte grotesque & Trio; 3. Rondeau; 4. Menuet I / Menuet II; 5. Gigue à l'Angloise; 6. Loure; 7. Passepied I / Passepied II. Trio	—	Telemann Portal; Catalogue TWV
TWV 55	TWV 55:e10	Ouverture	E minor	oboe / flute, strings and basso continuo	1. Ouverture; 2. Rigaudon; 3. Carillon; 4. Air. Tendrement; 5. Gigue; 6. Menuet I / Menuet II. Doucement	—	Telemann Portal; Catalogue TWV
TWV 55	TWV 55:f1	Ouverture	F minor	2 recorders, strings and basso continuo	1. Ouverture; 2. Menuet I / Menuet II; 3. Rondeau; 4. Sarabande; 5. Passepied; 6. Plainte; 7. Allemande; 8. Chaconne; 9. Gigue	—	Telemann Portal; Catalogue TWV
TWV 55	TWV 55:fis1	Ouverture	F♯ minor	Strings and basso continuo	1. Ouverture; 2. Les Plaisirs; 3. Angloise. Vivement; 4. La Badinerie italienne. Viste; 5. Loure; 6. Menuet I / Menuet II. Doucement; 7. Courante; 8. Le Batelage	—	Telemann Portal; Catalogue TWV
TWV 55	TWV 55:g1	Ouverture "La Musette"	G minor	2 ad lib horns, strings and basso continuo	1. Ouverture; 2.Napolitaine I / Napolitaine II en Musette (G major); 3. Polonoise; 4. Mourky (G major); 5. Menuet I / Menuet II; 6. Musette en Rondeau; 7. Harlequinade	# 6 from 6 Ouvertures à 4 ou 6	Telemann Portal; Catalogue TWV
TWV 55	TWV 55:g2	Ouverture "La Changeante"	G minor	Strings and basso continuo	1. Ouverture; 2. Loure (D major); 3. Les Scaramouches. Vitement (B minor); 4. Menuet I (E minor) / Menuet II. Doux (E major); 5. La Plaisanterie (C major); 6. Hornpipe (F major); 7. Avec doucor (B♭ major); 8. Canarie	—	Telemann Portal; Catalogue TWV
TWV 55	TWV 55:g3	Ouverture	G minor	2 oboes and bassoon, strings and basso continuo	1. Ouverture; 2. Preludio. Grave; 3. Aria I. Allegro; 4. Aria II en Rondeau. Allegro; 5. Aria III. Tempo di Menuet; 6. Aria IV. Allegro; 7. Aria V. Tempo giusto 8. Aria VI. Allegro assai	—	Telemann Portal; Catalogue TWV
TWV 55	TWV 55:g4	Ouverture	G minor	3 oboes and bassoon, strings and basso continuo	1. Ouverture; 2. Rondeau. Gayement; 3. Les Irrésoluts. À discrétion 4. Les Capricieux; 5. Loure; 6. Gasconnade; 7. Menuet I / Menuet II	—	Telemann Portal; Catalogue TWV
TWV 55	TWV 55:g5	Ouverture	G minor	Strings and basso continuo	1. Ouverture; 2. Loure; 3. Bourrée I / Bourrée II (G major); 4. Menuet I / Menuet II; 5. Air angloise	—	Telemann Portal; Catalogue TWV
TWV 55	TWV 55:g6	Ouverture	G minor	Strings and basso continuo	1. Ouverture; 2. Rondeau; 3. Rigaudon; 4. Menuet I / Menuet II; 5. Loure; 6. Gavotte; 7. Gigue	—	Telemann Portal; Catalogue TWV
TWV 55	TWV 55:g7	Ouverture	G minor	violin, strings and basso continuo	1. Ouverture / Très vite 2. Cajolerie; 3. Rondeau; 4. Loure (G minor/D major); 5. Gavotte; 6. Menuet I / Menuet II	—	Telemann Portal; Catalogue TWV
TWV 55	TWV 55:g8	Ouverture	G minor	2 violins, strings and basso continuo	1. Ouverture; 2. Rondeau; 3. Passepied; 4. Sarabande; 5. Echo. Vistement; 6. Passacaglia; 7. Menuet I / Menuet II (G major)	—	Telemann Portal; Catalogue TWV
TWV 55	TWV 55:g9	Ouverture	G minor	2 oboes, strings and basso continuo	1. Ouverture; 2. Gavotte en Rondeau; 3. Loure. Gravement (D major); 4. Gigue I. Légèrement (G major) / Gigue II; 5. Menuet I / Menuet II. Doux (G major); 6. No title (G major); 7. Chaconne	—	Telemann Portal; Catalogue TWV
TWV 55	TWV 55:h1	Ouverture	B minor	2 violins, 2 oboes and 2 bassoons, strings and basso continuo	1. Ouverture; 2. Courante; 3. Air en Rondeau; 4. Menuet; 5. Chaconne; 6. Gavotte I / Gavotte II; 7. Menuet I / Menuet II à deux bassons (D major)	—	Telemann Portal; Catalogue TWV
TWV 55	TWV 55:h2	Ouverture	B minor	Strings and basso continuo	1. Ouverture; 2. Air; 3. Rondeau; 4. Loure; 5. Entrée; 6. Air en Rondeau; 7. Menuet I / Menuet II (D major); 8. Gigue	—	Telemann Portal; Catalogue TWV
TWV 55	TWV 55:h3	Ouverture "La Prude"	B minor	Strings and basso continuo	1. Ouverture; 2. La Prude; 3. Gavotte; 4. Gigue; 5. Rigaudon; 6. Menuet I / Menuet II; 7. Rondeau; 8. Canaries	—	Telemann Portal; Catalogue TWV
TWV 55	TWV 55:h4	Ouverture	B minor	violin, strings and basso continuo	1. Ouverture; 2. Gavotte; 3. Loure; 4. Réjouissance. Très viste 5. La Bravoure; 6. Menuet I / Menuet II (B major); 7. Rodomontade	—	Telemann Portal; Catalogue TWV
TWV 55	TWV Anh. 55:A1	Ouverture	A major	Strings and basso continuo	1. Ouverture; 2. Rondeau; 3. Sarabande; 4. Courante; 5. Menuet I / Menuet II (A minor); 6. Loure; 7. Rondeau angloise	—	Telemann Portal; Catalogue TWV
TWV 55	TWV Anh. 55:G1	Ouverture "La Putain"	G major	Strings and basso continuo	1. Ouverture. Alla breve - Lento / Allegro; 2. Masquerade. Die Schneckenpost; 3. Loure. Die Bauren Kirchweyh; 4. Menuet; 5. Rondeau. Der Hexen-Tantz (C major); 6. Sarabande. Adagio / Presto / Adagio; 7. Marche; 8. Casconnade. In der Laussherberg; 9. Menuet & Trio; 10. Bourrée. Die Baass Lissabeth; 11. Hornpipe. Der Vetter Michel Ziehbart	—	Catalogue TWV
TWV 55	TWV Anh. 55:G2	Suite	G major	Solo instrument and basso continuo	—	= TVWV 11:21	Telemann Portal; Catalogue TWV

== See also ==
- Telemann-Werke-Verzeichnis (TWV)
- List of vocal works by Georg Philipp Telemann (TVWV)
