= List of church cantatas by liturgical occasion =

The following is a list of church cantatas, sorted by the liturgical occasion for which they were composed and performed. The genre was particularly popular in 18th-century Lutheran Germany, although there are later examples.

The liturgical calendar of the German Reformation era had, without counting Reformation Day and days between Palm Sunday and Easter, 72 occasions for which a cantata could be presented. Composers such as Telemann composed cycles of church cantatas comprising all 72 occasions (e.g. Harmonischer Gottes-Dienst). Such a cycle is called an "ideal" cycle, while in any given liturgical year feast days could coincide with Sundays, and the maximum number of Sundays after Epiphany and the maximum number of Sundays after Trinity could not all occur.

In some places, of which Leipzig in Johann Sebastian Bach's time is best known, no concerted music was allowed for the three last Sundays of Advent, nor for the Sundays of Lent (apart when Annunciation fell on a Sunday in that period, or in Holy Week), so the "ideal" year cycle (German: Jahrgang) for such places comprised only 64 cantatas (or 63 without the cantata for Reformation Day).

As the bulk of extant cantatas were composed for occasions occurring in the liturgical calendar of the German Reformation era, including Passion cantatas for Good Friday, that calendar is followed for the presentation of cantatas in this section. Most cantatas made reference to the content of the readings and to Lutheran hymns appropriate for the occasion. The melodies of such hymns often appeared in cantatas, for example as in the four-part settings concluding Bach's works, or as a cantus firmus in larger choral movements. Other occasions for church cantatas include weddings and funeral services. Thus below also readings and hymns associated with the occasion are listed, for the hymns for instance based on Vopelius' Neu Leipziger Gesangbuch. Data such as readings and hymns generally apply to Bach's Leipzig: differences may occur in other places, or other times, as indicated.

== Occasions of the liturgical year ==
Advent
Advent is celebrated on the four Sundays before Christmas. Sometimes, as in Leipzig, there was a tempus clausum (silent time: no cantatas performed) for the last three Sundays of Advent.
Christmas to Epiphany
The Christmas season was celebrated from Christmas Day through Epiphany. Three days were observed for Christmas, with a Christmas cantata performed every day. The next feast days were New Year and Epiphany. Sundays may occur between the third day of Christmas and New Year and/or between New Year and Epiphany: thus the period had at least five occasions, or at most seven.
For the Christmas season of 1734–35 Bach composed the Christmas Oratorio in six parts, to be performed as the cantata in the service on the six feast days, three days of Christmas, New Year, the Sunday after New Year and Epiphany (there was no Sunday between the third day of Christmas and New Year in 1734).
Sundays after Epiphany
Depending on the date of Easter, a variable number (up to six) of Sundays occurred between Epiphany and Septuagesima, the third Sunday before Ash Wednesday. The sixth Sunday after Epiphany is extremely rare: in the first half of the 18th century cantatas for this Sunday were only composed in "ideal" cantata cycles, but for instance not by composers such as Bach and Graupner who generally only composed what was to be performed under their direction.
Pre-Lenten Season
There were three Sundays in the Pre-Lenten Season: Septuagesima, Sexagesima and Quinquagesima (the last one also known as Estomihi)
Lent
During Lent, the six Sundays between Ash Wednesday and Easter, "quiet time" was observed in Leipzig. Only the feast of Annunciation was celebrated with a cantata, even if it fell in that time. On Good Friday, a Passion was performed, in most cases rather considered an Oratorio than a cantata. In Graupner's Darmstadt there was also a cantata on Maundy Thursday.
Easter to Pentecost
Eastertide comprises the time up to Pentecost, starting with three days of Easter. There are five Sundays between Easter and Ascension. Ascension is followed by one Sunday before the three feast days of Pentecost.
The Sundays between Easter and Pentecost have Latin names, derived from the beginning of the prescribed readings. For example, the first Sunday after Easter is called Quasimodogeniti. Some sources name the Sunday after Easter the second Sunday in Easter, counting Easter Sunday as the first.
Trinity and the Sundays after Trinity
Trinity is the Sunday after Pentecost. A variable number of Sundays occurs between Trinity and the first Sunday in Advent, a maximum of 27, if Easter is extremely early.
Marian feasts
There are three Marian feast days that are usually observed in the German Reformation era: Purification on 2 February, Annunciation on 25 March and Visitation on 2 July
Feast of John the Baptist
St. John's Day was celebrated on 24 June, with cantatas written by, among others, Bach and Telemann.
Feast of St. Michael
St. Michael's Day was celebrated on 29 September with, for instance, cantatas by Bach and Telemann, but in Graupner's Darmstadt there was apparently no demand for such cantatas.
Feast of St. Stephen
Saint Stephen's Day falls on 26 December, the second day of Christmas, so generally not counted as a separate occasion.
Reformation Day
Reformation Day is celebrated on 31 October and for instance Bach and Graupner wrote cantatas for the occasion. Reformation Day is however not always seen as one of the feasts of the liturgical year: for instance in Telemann's and Picander's ideal cantata cycles the feast day is not mentioned.

Telemann's ideal cycle thus consists of four Sundays of Advent; Seven occasions from Christmas to Epiphany; Nine Sundays between Epiphany and Lent; Six Sundays of Lent; 14 occasions from Easter to Trinity; 27 Sundays after Trinity; Three Marian Feasts, St. John's Day (24 June) and Michaelmas – totalling 72 occasions for which he provided a cantata.

Graupner's church cantatas do not include the sixth Sunday after Epiphany, nor cantatas for St. John's Day or Michaelmas, however there are cantatas for Maundy Thursday and Good Friday, which totals 71 occasions from GWV 1101 to 1171, with GWV 1173 indicating Reformation Day cantatas.

Libretto cycles
Several cantata libretto cycles were published in the first half of the 18th century:
- Erdmann Neumeister:
  - Geistliche Cantaten (1702)
- Anonymous (Ernst Ludwig I, Duke of Saxe-Meiningen?)
  - Sonn- und Fest-Andachten (Meiningen 1704)
- Benjamin Schmolck:
  - Das Saiten-Spiel des Hertzens (1720)
- Picander:
  - Sammlung Erbaulicher Gedanken (1724–25)
  - Cantaten auf die Sonn- und Fest-Tage durch das gantze Jahr (1728–29)

=== First Sunday of Advent (Advent I) ===
Occasion
Advent Sunday, first of the four Sundays of Advent, which are the four Sundays preceding Christmas
Readings
Romans 13:11–14, night is advanced, day will come
Matthew 21:1–9, the Entry into Jerusalem
Hymns
"Nun komm, der Heiden Heiland" by Martin Luther (Erfurt Enchiridion, 1524) and its Latin model "Veni redemptor gentium" by Ambrose
"Von Adam her so lange Zeit" by Michael Weiße
"Menschenkind merk eben" by Michael Weiße
"Gottes Sohn ist kommen" by Michael Weiße or Johann Horn
"Als der gütige Gott" (text by Michael Weiße, hymn tune by Johann Crüger)
"Mittit ad virginem" (text by Peter Abelard)
"Lob sei dem allmächtigen Gott" (text by Michael Weiße, hymn tune by Johann Crüger)
"Gott durch deine Güte"
"Heilig ist Gott der Vater"
"Gläubiges Herze, freu dich heut" by Michael Altenburg
"Gott, heilger Schöpfer aller Stern" and its Latin model "Conditor alme siderum"
"Frohlock o Tochter Zion fast"
"Nun jauchzet, all ihr Frommen" by Michael Schirmer
"Gott Vater uns sein Sohn fürstellt"
"Wir danken dir, Herr Jesu Christ, Daß du vom Himmel kommen bist" by Bartholomäus Helder
"Macht hoch die Tür" by Georg Weissel (after Psalm 24:7-10)
Cantatas
Georg Böhm:
- Nun komm, der Heiden Heiland
Georg Philipp Telemann:
- Saget der Tochter Zion, TWV 1:1234 (1716–17 cantata cycle)
- Machet die Tore weit, TWV 1:1074 (1722?; staged in Leipzig 28 November 1734; BDW 08913)
- Erwachet zum Kriegen, TWV 1:481 (Harmonischer Gottes-Dienst, 1725-1726)
Christoph Graupner (see also List of cantatas by Christoph Graupner § GWV 1101):
- Machet die Tore weit, GWV 1101/27 (1727)
Johann Sebastian Bach (see also Church cantata (Bach) § Advent I):
- Nun komm, der Heiden Heiland, BWV 61 (2 December 1714; 28 November 1723)
- Nun komm, der Heiden Heiland, BWV 62 (chorale cantata, 3 December 1724)
- Schwingt freudig euch empor, BWV 36 (early version: 1725-30; final version: 2 December 1731)
Gottfried Heinrich Stölzel:
- O Herr hilf o Herr laß wohl gelingen, H. 339 (1738)
- Saget der Tochter Zion siehe dein Heil kommt, H. 348
- Komm herein du Gesegneter des Herrn, H. 349
- Küsset den Sohn daß er nicht zürne, H. 350
Wilhelm Friedemann Bach
- Lasset uns ablegen die Werke der Finsternis, BR F 1 (30 November 1749, BDW 09449)

=== Second Sunday of Advent (Advent II) ===
Occasion
Second Sunday in Advent
Readings
Romans 15:4–13, call of the Gentiles
Luke 21:25–36, coming of the Son of man
Hymns (in addition to those listed for Advent I)
"Es ist gewißlich an der zeit" (text by Bartholomäus Ringwaldt)
Cantatas
Georg Philipp Telemann:
- Huetet euch, dass eure Herzen, TWV 1:811 (1716–17 cantata cycle)
- Endlich wird die Stunde schlagen, TWV 1:440 (Harmonischer Gottes-Dienst, 1725-1726)
Christoph Graupner:
- see List of cantatas by Christoph Graupner § GWV 1102
Johann Sebastian Bach (see also Church cantata (Bach) § Advent II):
- Wachet! betet! betet! wachet! BWV 70a (6 December 1716)
Gottfried Heinrich Stölzel:
- Es danken dir Gott die Völker, H. 340 (1737)

=== Third Sunday of Advent (Advent III) ===
Occasion
Third Sunday of Advent, a.k.a. Gaudete Sunday
Readings
1 Corinthians 4:1–5, the ministry of faithful apostles
Matthew 11:2–10, John the Baptist in prison
Hymns (in addition to those listed for Advent I)
"Helft mir Gotts Güte preisen"
Cantatas
Georg Philipp Telemann:
- Mein Kind, willtu Gottes Diener sein, TWV 1:1129 (1716–17 cantata cycle)
- Das ist je gewißlich wahr, TWV 1:183 (1719 or 1720, based on 1 Timothy 1:15; misattributed to Bach as BWV 141, BDW 00173)
- Vor des lichten Tages Schein, TWV 1:1483 (Harmonischer Gottes-Dienst, Hamburg 1726; text refers to Psalm 139:11–12, Matthew 7:5 and John 8:7)
Christoph Graupner:
- see List of cantatas by Christoph Graupner § GWV 1103
Johann Sebastian Bach (see also Church cantata (Bach) § Advent III):
- Ärgre dich, o Seele, nicht, BWV 186a (13 December 1716)
Gottfried Heinrich Stölzel:
- Siehe da ist euer Gott, H. 341 (1740)
- Erkennet doch daß der Herr seine Heiligen wunderlich führet, H. 351

=== Fourth Sunday of Advent (Advent IV) ===
Occasion
Fourth Sunday in Advent
Readings
Philippians 4:4–7, Be joyful in the Lord
John 1:19–28, testimony of John the Baptist
Hymns
same as for Advent III
Cantatas
Georg Philipp Telemann
- Ihr seid alle Gottes Kinder, TWV 1:914 (1716–17 cantata cycle)
- Lauter Wonne, lauter Freude, TWV 1:1040 (Harmonischer Gottes-Dienst, 1725-1726)
Christoph Graupner:
- see List of cantatas by Christoph Graupner § GWV 1104
Johann Sebastian Bach (see also Church cantata (Bach) § Advent IV):
- Bereitet die Wege, bereitet die Bahn, BWV 132 (22 December 1715)
- Herz und Mund und Tat und Leben, BWV 147a (20 December 1716)
Gottfried Heinrich Stölzel:
- Gelobet sei Gott und der Vater (1737)

=== Christmas (25 December) ===
Occasion
Christmas (25 December)
Readings
Titus 2:11–14, God's mercy appeared (or
Isaiah 9:2–7, Unto us a child is born)
Luke 2:1–14, Nativity, Annunciation to the shepherds and the angels' song
Hymns
"Christum wir sollen loben schon" (Luther, Erfurt Enchirdion, 1524)
"Gelobet seist du, Jesu Christ" (Luther, Eyn geystlich Gesangk Buchleyn, 1524)
"Vom Himmel hoch, da komm ich her" (Luther, 1534; melody 1539)
"Vom Himmel kam der Engel Schar" (Luther, same melody as previous)
Cantatas
Georg Philipp Telemann:
- Erquickendes Wunder der ewigen Gnade, TWV 1:469 (Harmonischer Gottes-Dienst, Hamburg 1726)
Christoph Graupner (see also List of cantatas by Christoph Graupner § GWV 1105 and § GWV 1172):
- Magnificat anima mea, GWV 1172/22 (1722; also January 1723 in Leipzig, as audition piece for his candidacy as Thomaskantor)
Johann Sebastian Bach (see also Church cantata (Bach) § Christmas Day):
- Christen, ätzet diesen Tag, BWV 63 (1714; 1723)
- Magnificat, BWV 243a (1723)
- Gelobet seist du, Jesu Christ, BWV 91 (chorale cantata, two versions, earliest version 1724)
- Unser Mund sei voll Lachens, BWV 110 (1725)
- Ehre sei Gott in der Höhe, BWV 197a (1728)
- Jauchzet, frohlocket! Auf, preiset die Tage, BWV 248^{I} (Christmas Oratorio Part I, 1734)
- Gloria in excelsis Deo, BWV 191 (1745)
- Uns ist ein Kind geboren, BWV 142 (probably spurious)
Gottfried Heinrich Stölzel:
- Ehre sei Gott in der Höhe, H. 342
- Ehre sei Gott in der Höhe, H. 352 (1737)
- Ehre sei Gott in der Höhe (1720)
- Jauchzet ihr Himmel freue dich Erde, H. 354
Wilhelm Friedemann Bach:
- O Wunder, wer kann dieses fassen, BR F 2 (BDW 09774)
- Ach, daß du den Himmel zerrissest, BR F 3 (BDW 09776)
- Ehre sei Gott in der Höhe, BR F 4 (BDW 09778)
Carl Philipp Emanuel Bach:
- Ehre sei Gott in der Höhe, H 811 (1772, 1778 and 1782; BDW 02237)
- Auf schicke dich, H 815 (1775, 1779 and 1786; BDW 02258)
Georg Anton Benda:
- Gott steigt herab (arranged by C. P. E. Bach for performances in 1771, 1777 and 1784: BDW 10617)
Johann Christoph Friedrich Bach:
- Dessen Preis die Hirten sangen (c.1788 or later, BDW 01953)

=== Second Day of Christmas (26 December: Christmas 2) ===
Occasion
Second day of Christmas (Boxing Day), also Saint Stephen's Day; On this day Leipzig celebrated Christmas and Saint Stephen's Day in alternating years, with different readings.
Readings
For Christmas (even years):

Titus 3:4–7, God's mercy appeared in Christ
Luke 2:15–20, the shepherds at the manger

for Saint Stephen's Day (uneven years):

Acts 6:8–15 and 7:55–60, Martyrdom of Stephen
Matthew 23:35–39, Jerusalem killing her prophets

Hymns
See Christmas
Cantatas
Georg Philipp Telemann:
- Jauchzet, frohlocket, der Himmel ist offen, TWV 1:953 (Harmonischer Gottes-Dienst, Hamburg 1726 – cantata for Saint Stephen's Day)
Christoph Graupner:
- see List of cantatas by Christoph Graupner § GWV 1106
Johann Sebastian Bach (see also Church cantata (Bach) § Second Day of Christmas):
- Darzu ist erschienen der Sohn Gottes, BWV 40 (1723)
- Christum wir sollen loben schon, BWV 121 (chorale cantata, 1724)
- Selig ist der Mann, BWV 57 (1725)
- Und es waren Hirten in derselben Gegend, BWV 248^{II} (Christmas Oratorio Part II, 1734)
Gottfried Heinrich Stölzel:
- Bist willkommen du edler Gast, H. 343
- Uns ist ein Kind geboren, H. 353
Carl Heinrich Graun and Carl Philipp Emanuel Bach
- Ich nahe mich zu deiner Krippen (C. P. E. Bach's arrangement of C. H. Graun's GraunWV Bv:IX:14; BDW 10557)

=== Third Day of Christmas (27 December: Christmas 3) ===
Occasion
Third day of Christmas, also Feast of St. John the Evangelist
Readings
Hebrews 1:1–14, Christ is higher than the angels (Leipzig); Isaiah 9:1–6 (Hamburg)
John 1:1–14, prologue, also called Hymn to the Word
Hymns
See Christmas
Cantatas
Georg Philipp Telemann:
- Unverzagt in allem Leiden, TWV 1:1456 (Harmonischer Gottes-Dienst, Hamburg 1726)
Christoph Graupner:
- see List of cantatas by Christoph Graupner § GWV 1107
Johann Sebastian Bach (see also Church cantata (Bach) § Third Day of Christmas):
- Sehet, welch eine Liebe hat uns der Vater erzeiget, BWV 64 (1723)
- Ich freue mich in dir, BWV 133 (chorale cantata, 1724)
- Süßer Trost, mein Jesus kömmt, BWV 151 (1725)
- Herrscher des Himmels, erhöre das Lallen, BWV 248^{III} (Christmas Oratorio Part III, 1734)
Gottfried Heinrich Stölzel:
- Herr tue meine Lippen auf, H. 322 (St. John the Evangelist)
- Herzlich lieb hab ich dich o Herr, H. 344
- Kündlich groß ist das gottselige Geheimnis
- Sehet welch eine Liebe hat uns der Vater erzeiget, H. 355
- Sind wir denn Kinder so sind wir auch Erben, H. 356

=== First Sunday after Christmas (Christmas I) ===
Occasion
Sunday between 27 December and 1 January, which does not occur every year. A.k.a. Christmas Sunday.
Readings
Galatians 4:1–7, Through Christ we are free from the law
Luke 2:33–40, Simeon and Anna with Mary in the temple
Hymns
See Christmas
Cantatas
Georg Philipp Telemann:
- Was gleicht dem Adel wahrer Christen, TWV 1:1511 (Harmonischer Gottes-Dienst, Hamburg 1726)
Christoph Graupner:
- see List of cantatas by Christoph Graupner § GWV 1108
Johann Sebastian Bach (see also Church cantata (Bach) § Christmas I):
- Tritt auf die Glaubensbahn, BWV 152 (30 December 1714)
- Das neugeborne Kindelein, BWV 122 (chorale cantata, 31 December 1724)
- Gottlob! nun geht das Jahr zu Ende, BWV 28 (30 December 1725)
Gottfried Heinrich Stölzel:
- Gott ist wundersam in seinem Heiligtum (1737)

=== New Year (1 January) ===
Occasion
New Year; Feast of the Circumcision of Christ
Readings
Galatians 3:23–29: by faith we inherit
Luke 2:21: circumcision of Jesus
Hymns
"Jesu, nun sei gepreiset" by Johannes Hermann
Cantatas
Georg Philipp Telemann:
- Halt ein mit deinem Wetterstrahle, TWV 1:715 (Harmonischer Gottes-Dienst, Hamburg 1726)
Melchior Hoffmann
- Singet dem Herrn ein neues Lied, previously attributed to Telemann as TWV 1:1748.
Christoph Graupner:
- see List of cantatas by Christoph Graupner § GWV 1109
Johann Sebastian Bach (see also Church cantata (Bach) § New Year's Day):
- Singet dem Herrn ein neues Lied, BWV 190 (1724; incomplete)
- Jesu, nun sei gepreiset, BWV 41 (chorale cantata, 1725)
- Herr Gott, dich loben wir, BWV 16 (1726)
- Gott, wie dein Name, so ist auch dein Ruhm, BWV 171 (1729)
- Fallt mit Danken, fallt mit Loben, BWV 248^{IV} (Christmas Oratorio Part IV, 1735)
Gottfried Heinrich Stölzel:
- Nun danket alle Gott, H. 345
- Der Herr hat Großes an uns getan, H. 360
- Gehet zu seinen Toren ein, H. 361
- Alles was ihr tut mit Worten oder mit Werken (1738)
Johann Friedrich Fasch:
- Gehet zu seinen Toren ein mit Danken, FWV D:G1, FR 9/2 (1723)
Wilhelm Friedemann Bach:
- Der Herr zu deiner Rechten, BR F 5 (BDW 09780)

=== Sunday after New Year (New Year I) ===
Occasion
In some years, a Sunday falls between New Year's Day and Epiphany: it is known as the Sunday after New Year (New Year I) or as the second Sunday after Christmas (Christmas II).
Readings
1 Peter 4:12–19: suffering of Christians (Leipzig); Titus 3:4–7: God's mercy appeared in Christ (Hamburg)
Matthew 2:13–23: the Flight into Egypt
Cantatas
Georg Philipp Telemann:
- Schmeckt und sehet unsers Gottes Freundlichkeit, TWV 1:1252 (Harmonischer Gottes-Dienst, Hamburg 1726)
Christoph Graupner:
- see List of cantatas by Christoph Graupner § GWV 1110
Johann Sebastian Bach (see also Church cantata (Bach) § New Year I):
- Schau, lieber Gott, wie meine Feind, BWV 153 (2 January 1724)
- Ach Gott, wie manches Herzeleid, BWV 58 (5 January 1727: early version, incomplete; 4 January 1733 or 3 January 1734: final version; strictly speaking not a chorale cantata, but later added to the chorale cantata cycle)
- Ehre sei dir, Gott, gesungen, BWV 248^{V} (Christmas Oratorio Part V, 2 January 1735)
Gottfried Heinrich Stölzel:
- Ich freue mich und bin fröhlich in dir (1738)

=== Epiphany (6 January) ===
Occasion
Feast of the Epiphany
Readings
Isaiah 60:1–6, the heathen will convert
Matthew 2:1–12, the Wise Men From the East
Cantatas
Georg Philipp Telemann:
- Ihr Völker hört, wie Gott aufs Neue spricht, TWV 1:921 (Harmonischer Gottes-Dienst, Hamburg 1726)
Christoph Graupner:
- see List of cantatas by Christoph Graupner § GWV 1111
Johann Sebastian Bach (see also Church cantata (Bach) § Epiphany):
- Sie werden aus Saba alle kommen, BWV 65 (1724)
- Liebster Immanuel, Herzog der Frommen, BWV 123 (chorale cantata, 1725)
- Herr, wenn die stolzen Feinde schnauben, BWV 248^{VI} (Christmas Oratorio Part VI, 1735)
Gottfried Heinrich Stölzel:
- Es danken dir Gott die Völker, H. 362
- Lobet den Herrn alle Heiden (1738)

=== First Sunday after Epiphany (Epiphany I) ===
Readings
Romans 12:1–6, the duties of a Christian
Luke 2:41–52, the finding in the Temple
Hymns
"Gelobet seist du, Jesu Christ"
"Dies sind die heilgen zehn Gebot"
"Herr Christ, der einig Gotts Sohn"
Cantatas
Georg Philipp Telemann:
- In gering- und rauhen Schalen, TWV 1:941 (Harmonischer Gottes-Dienst, Hamburg 1726)
Christoph Graupner:
- see List of cantatas by Christoph Graupner § GWV 1112
Johann Sebastian Bach (see also Church cantata (Bach) § Epiphany I):
- Mein liebster Jesus ist verloren, BWV 154 (9 January 1724)
- Meinen Jesum laß ich nicht, BWV 124 (chorale cantata, 7 January 1725)
- Liebster Jesu, mein Verlangen, BWV 32 (13 January 1726)
- Gedenke, Herr, wie es uns gehet, BWV 217 (very doubtful, possibly composed by Johann Christoph Altnickol)
Gottfried Heinrich Stölzel:
- Herr ich habe lieb die Stätte deines Hauses (1738)

=== Second Sunday after Epiphany (Epiphany II) ===
Readings
Romans 12:6–16, we have several gifts
John 2:1–11, the Marriage at Cana
Hymns
"Herr Christ, der einig Gotts Sohn"
"Wie schön leuchtet der Morgenstern"
"Am dritten Tag ein Hochzeit ward"
Cantatas
Georg Philipp Telemann:
- Ist Widerwärtigkeit den Frommen eigen?, TWV 1:948 (Harmonischer Gottes-Dienst, Hamburg 1726)
Christoph Graupner:
- see List of cantatas by Christoph Graupner § GWV 1113
Johann Sebastian Bach (see also Church cantata (Bach) § Epiphany II):
- Mein Gott, wie lang, ach lange? BWV 155 (19 January 1716)
- Ach Gott, wie manches Herzeleid, BWV 3 (chorale cantata, 14 January 1725)
- Meine Seufzer, meine Tränen, BWV 13 (20 January 1726)
Wilhelm Friedemann Bach
- Wir sind Gottes Werke, BR F 6 (incomplete, BDW 09782)
Carl Friedrich Christian Fasch and Carl Philipp Emanuel Bach:
- Harre auf Gott (C. P. E. Bach's expansion of a 3-movement cantata by Fasch, BDW 10534)
Gottfried Heinrich Stölzel:
- Herr wie lange willst du mein so gar vergessen, H. 300
- Was Gott tut das ist wohlgetan, H. 389
- Gottes Rat ist wunderbarlich (1738)

=== Third Sunday after Epiphany (Epiphany III) ===
Readings
Romans 12:17–21, rules for life
Matthew 8:1–13, the healing of a leper
Hymns
"Allein zu dir, Herr Jesu Christ"
"Ich ruf zu dir, Herr Jesu Christ"
"Vater unser im Himmelreich"
Cantatas
Georg Philipp Telemann:
- Warum verstellst du die Gebärden?, TWV 1:1502 (Harmonischer Gottes-Dienst, Hamburg 1726)
Christoph Graupner:
- see List of cantatas by Christoph Graupner § GWV 1114
Johann Sebastian Bach (see also Church cantata (Bach) § Epiphany III):
- Herr, wie du willt, so schicks mit mir, BWV 73 (23 January 1724; restaged 1732–35 and 1748–49)
- Was mein Gott will, das g'scheh allzeit, BWV 111 (chorale cantata, 21 January 1725)
- Alles nur nach Gottes Willen, BWV 72 (27 January 1726)
- Ich steh mit einem Fuß im Grabe, BWV 156 (23 January 1729)
Gottfried Heinrich Stölzel:
- Siehe hie bin ich, H. 329
- Das ist die Freudigkeit die wir haben zu Gott, H. 363
- Gelobet sei der Herr täglich (1738)

=== Fourth Sunday after Epiphany (Epiphany IV) ===
Readings
Romans 13:8–10, love completes the law
Matthew 8:23–27, Jesus calming the storm
Hymns
"Wenn wir in höchsten Nöten sein"
"Wo Gott der Herr nicht bei uns hält"
"Wär Gott nicht mit uns diese Zeit"
"Aus tiefer Not schrei ich zu dir"
"Es ist das Heil uns kommen her"
Cantatas
Johann Ludwig Bach:
- Gott ist unser Zuversicht, JLB 1 (3 February 1726, BDW 08231)
Georg Philipp Telemann:
- Hemmet den Eifer, verbannet die Rache, TWV 1:730 (Harmonischer Gottes-Dienst, Hamburg 1726)
Christoph Graupner:
- see List of cantatas by Christoph Graupner § GWV 1115
Johann Sebastian Bach (see also Church cantata (Bach) § Epiphany IV):
- Jesus schläft, was soll ich hoffen? BWV 81 (30 January 1724)
- Wär Gott nicht mit uns diese Zeit, BWV 14 (chorale cantata, 30 January 1735)

=== Purification (2 February) ===
Occasion
Candlemas or Feast of the Purification of Mary (Mariae Reinigung), a.k.a. Presentation of Jesus at the Temple: celebrated on 2 February, occurring around the fourth Sunday after Epiphany
Readings
Malachi 3:1–4, the Lord will come to his temple
Luke 2:22–32, the purification of Mary and the presentation of Jesus at the Temple, including Simeon's canticle Nunc dimittis
Hymns
"Mit Fried und Freud ich fahr dahin"
"Herr, nun lässest du deinen Diener"
"Nunc dimittis"
"Ex legis observantia"
"Heut hat Marien Kindelein"
Cantatas
Johann Ludwig Bach:
- Mache dich auf, werde licht, JLB 9 (1726, BDW 08233)
Georg Philipp Telemann:
- Ich habe Lust abzuscheiden, TWV 1:836 (1724; a.k.a. BWV Anh. 157, BDW 01468)
- Erscheine, Gott, in deinem Tempel, TWV 1:471 (Harmonischer Gottes-Dienst, Hamburg 1726)
Christoph Graupner (see also List of cantatas by Christoph Graupner#GWV 1169):
- Valet will ich dir geben, GWV 1169/32 (1732)
Johann Sebastian Bach (see also Church cantata (Bach) § Purification):
- Erfreute Zeit im neuen Bunde, BWV 83 (1724)
- Mit Fried und Freud ich fahr dahin, BWV 125 (chorale cantata, 1725)
- Ich habe genug, BWV 82 (1727, and later modified versions)
Gottfried Heinrich Stölzel:
- Wir haben hier keine bleibende Stätte, H. 313
- So nimm doch nun Herr meine Seele von mir, H. 358
Johann Ernst Bach II:
- Mein Odem ist schwach (misattributed to J. S. Bach as BWV 222; BDW 00279)

=== Fifth Sunday after Epiphany (Epiphany V) ===
Readings
Colossians 3:12–17
...
Hymns
"Ach Gott, vom Himmel sieh darein"
"Es spricht der Unweisen Mund wohl"
"Ich ruf zu dir, Herr Jesu Christ"
Cantatas
Johann Ludwig Bach:
- Der Gottlosen Arbeit, JLB 2 (10 February 1726, BDW 08241)
Georg Philipp Telemann:
- Seid nüchtern und wachet, TWV 1:1273 (1716–17 cantata cycle)
- Liebe, die vom Himmel stammet, TVWV 1:1044 (Harmonischer Gottes-Dienst, Hamburg 1726)
Christoph Graupner:
- see List of cantatas by Christoph Graupner § GWV 1116
Johann Sebastian Bach:
- no extant cantata for Epiphany V: see Church cantata (Bach) § Epiphany V.
Gottfried Heinrich Stölzel:
- Singet und spielet dem Herrn in euren Herzen, H. 390

=== Sixth Sunday after Epiphany (Epiphany VI) ===
Readings
2 Peter 1:16–21
...
Hymns
"Herr Christ, der einig Gotts Sohn"
Cantatas
Georg Philipp Telemann:
- Was ist das Herz? Ein finstrer Ort, TWV 1:1516 (Harmonischer Gottes-Dienst, Hamburg 1726)
Wilhelm Friedemann Bach
- Wie schön leuchtet der Morgenstern (Ihr Lichter jener schönen Höhen), BR F 7 (12 February 1764, BDW 09784)
Johann Sebastian Bach:
- no extant cantata for Epiphany VI: see Church cantata (Bach) § Epiphany VI.

=== Third Sunday before Lent (Septuagesima) ===
Occasion
Septuagesima (third Sunday before Ash Wednesday)
Readings
1 Corinthians 9:24–10:5, race for victory
Matthew 20:1–16, parable of the Workers in the Vineyard
Hymns
"Vater unser im Himmelreich"
"Ich ruf zu dir, Herr Jesu Christ"
"O Herre Gott, dein göttlich Wort"
"Es ist das Heil uns kommen her"
Cantatas
Johann Ludwig Bach:
- Darum will ich auch erwählen, JLB 3 (17 February 1726, BDW 08184)
Georg Philipp Telemann:
- Ein jeder läuft, der in den Schranken läuft, TWV 1:425 (Harmonischer Gottes-Dienst, Hamburg 1726)
Christoph Graupner:
- see List of cantatas by Christoph Graupner § GWV 1117
Johann Sebastian Bach (see also Church cantata (Bach) § Septuagesima):
- Nimm, was dein ist, und gehe hin, BWV 144 (6 February 1724)
- Ich hab in Gottes Herz und Sinn, BWV 92 (chorale cantata, 28 January 1725)
- Ich bin vergnügt mit meinem Glücke, BWV 84 (9 February 1727)
Gottfried Heinrich Stölzel:
- Freuet euch der Barmherzigkeit Gottes (1738)

=== Second Sunday before Lent (Sexagesima) ===
Occasion
Sexagesima (second Sunday before Ash Wednesday)
Readings
2 Corinthians 11:19–12:9, God's power is mighty in the week,
Luke 8:4–15, parable of the Sower
Hymns
"Ich ruf zu dir, Herr Jesu Christ"
"Ach Gott, vom Himmel sieh darein"
Cantatas
Johann Ludwig Bach:
- Darum säet euch Gerechtigkeit, JLB 4 (24 February 1726, BDW 08243)
Georg Philipp Telemann:
- Was ist mir doch das Rühmen nütze?, TWV 1:1521 (Harmonischer Gottes-Dienst, Hamburg 1726)
Christoph Graupner:
- see List of cantatas by Christoph Graupner § GWV 1118
Johann Sebastian Bach (see also Church cantata (Bach) § Sexagesima):
- Gleichwie der Regen und Schnee vom Himmel fällt, BWV 18 (early version: 24 February 1715; A minor version: 13 February 1724)
- Leichtgesinnte Flattergeister, BWV 181 (13 February 1724; restaged c.1743–46)
- Erhalt uns, Herr, bei deinem Wort, BWV 126 (chorale cantata, 4 February 1725)
Gottfried Heinrich Stölzel:
- Selig sind die Gottes Wort hören, H. 330
- O Land höre des Herren Wort, H. 338
- Nehmet das Wort an mit Sanftmut (1738)

=== Last Sunday before Lent (Estomihi) ===
Occasion
Quinquagesima a.k.a. Quintagesima, Esto Mihi or Estomihi Sunday (last Sunday before Lent)
Readings
1 Corinthians 13:1–13, praise of love
Luke 18:31–43, Healing the blind near Jericho
Hymns
"Durch Adams Fall ist ganz verderbt"
"Die Propheten han propheceyt"
"O wir armen Sünder"
"Sündiger Mensch, schau wer du bist"
Cantatas
Johann Ludwig Bach:
- Ja, mir hast du Arbeit gemacht, JLB 5 (3 March 1726, BDW 08208)
Georg Philipp Telemann:
- Seele, lerne dich erkennen, TWV 1:1258 (Harmonischer Gottes-Dienst, Hamburg 1726)
Christoph Graupner:
- see List of cantatas by Christoph Graupner § GWV 1119
Johann Sebastian Bach (see also Church cantata (Bach) § Estomihi):
- Jesus nahm zu sich die Zwölfe, BWV 22 (7 February 1723 and 20 February 1724)
- Du wahrer Gott und Davids Sohn, BWV 23 (second version in B minor: 7 February 1723 and 20 February 1724; earlier and later versions in C minor)
- Herr Jesu Christ, wahr' Mensch und Gott, BWV 127 (chorale cantata, 11 February 1725)
- Sehet, wir gehn hinauf gen Jerusalem, BWV 159 (27 February 1729)
Gottfried Heinrich Stölzel:
- Siehe dein König kommt zu dir (1738)
Gottfried August Homilius:
- Legt eure Harfen hin, HoWV II.49 (BDW 08999, 11062)

=== First Sunday of Lent (Invocabit) ===
Occasion
Quadragesima Sunday, a.k.a. Invocabit or Invocavit Sunday
Readings
2 Corinthians 6:1–10, marks of the Ministry
Matthew 4:1–11, the Temptation of Christ
Hymns
"Vater unser im Himmelreich"
"Ein feste Burg ist unser Gott"
"Gott der Vater wohn uns bei"
"Christe, der du bist Tag und Licht" and its Latin version, "Christe qui lux es et dies"
Hymns related to the Passion of Christ (e.g. pp. 122–177 in Vopelius' Neu Leipziger Gesangbuch)
Cantatas
Georg Philipp Telemann:
- Fleuch der Lüste Zauberauen, TWV 1:549 (Harmonischer Gottes-Dienst, Hamburg 1726)
Christoph Graupner:
- see List of cantatas by Christoph Graupner#GWV 1120
Gottfried Heinrich Stölzel:
- Gelobet sei der Herr mein Hort (1738)

=== Second Sunday of Lent (Reminiscere) ===
Occasion
Reminiscere (second Sunday of Lent)
Readings
1 Thessalonians 4:1–7, plea for Purity
Matthew 17:1–9, the Transfiguration of Jesus
Hymns
"Ich ruf zu dir, Herr Jesu Christ"
"Wenn wir in höchsten Nöten sein"
"Gott der Vater wohn uns bei"
"Erbarm dich mein, o Herre Gott"
"Ein feste Burg ist unser Gott"
"Christe, der du bist Tag und Licht" and its Latin version, "Christe qui lux es et dies"
Hymns related to the Passion of Christ (e.g. pp. 122–177 in Vopelius' Neu Leipziger Gesangbuch)
Cantatas
Johann Michael Bach:
- Liebster Jesu, hör mein Flehen, ABA II, 6 (BDW 08798)
Georg Philipp Telemann:
- Der Reichtum macht allein beglückt, TWV 1:313 (Harmonischer Gottes-Dienst, Hamburg 1726)
Christoph Graupner:
- see List of cantatas by Christoph Graupner#GWV 1121
Gottfried Heinrich Stölzel:
- Ich danke dir Herr dass du zornig bist gewesen (1738)

=== Third Sunday of Lent (Oculi) ===
Occasion
Oculi (third Sunday of Lent)
Readings
Ephesians 5:1–9, advice for a righteous life
Luke 11:14–28, casting out a devil
Hymns
"Ich ruf zu dir, Herr Jesu Christ"
"Wenn wir in höchsten Nöten sein"
"Gott der Vater wohn uns bei"
"Erbarm dich mein, o Herre Gott"
"Ein feste Burg ist unser Gott"
"Christe, der du bist Tag und Licht" and its Latin version, "Christe qui lux es et dies"
Hymns related to the Passion of Christ (e.g. pp. 122–177 in Vopelius' Neu Leipziger Gesangbuch)
Cantatas
Georg Philipp Telemann:
- Wandelt in der Liebe, TWV 1:1498 (Harmonischer Gottes-Dienst, Hamburg 1726)
Christoph Graupner:
- see List of cantatas by Christoph Graupner#GWV 1122
Johann Sebastian Bach (see also Church cantata (Bach) § Oculi):
- Widerstehe doch der Sünde, BWV 54 (4 March 1714?)
- Alles, was von Gott geboren, BWV 80a (24 March 1715; music lost)
Gottfried Heinrich Stölzel:
- Dazu ist erschienen der Sohn Gottes (1738)

=== Fourth Sunday of Lent (Laetare) ===
Occasion
Laetare (fourth Sunday of Lent)
Readings
Galatians 4:21–31, two Covenants
John 6:1–15, feeding of the 5000
Hymns
"Herr Jesu Christ, wahr Mensch und Gott"
"O Jesu Christ, meins Lebens Licht"
"In dich hab ich gehoffet, Herr"
"Christe, der du bist Tag und Licht" and its Latin version, "Christe qui lux es et dies"
Hymns related to the Passion of Christ (e.g. pp. 122–177 in Vopelius' Neu Leipziger Gesangbuch)
Cantatas
Georg Philipp Telemann:
- Du bist verflucht, o Schreckensstimme, TWV 1:385 (Harmonischer Gottes-Dienst, Hamburg 1726)
Christoph Graupner:
- see List of cantatas by Christoph Graupner#GWV 1123
Gottfried Heinrich Stölzel:
- Danke für alles dem der dich geschaffen (1738)

=== Fifth Sunday of Lent (Judica) ===
Occasion
Judica (fifth Sunday of Lent)
Readings
Hebrews 9:11–15, the Heavenly Sanctuary
John 8:46–59, last part of Jesus' debate with the Pharisees
Hymns
"Herr Jesu Christ, wahr Mensch und Gott"
"O Jesu Christ, meins Lebens Licht"
"In dich hab ich gehoffet, Herr"
"Christe, der du bist Tag und Licht" and its Latin version, "Christe qui lux es et dies"
Hymns related to the Passion of Christ (e.g. pp. 122–177 in Vopelius' Neu Leipziger Gesangbuch)
Cantatas
Georg Philipp Telemann:
- Wer ist, der dort von Edom kömmt? TWV 1:1584 (Harmonischer Gottes-Dienst, Hamburg 1726)
Christoph Graupner:
- see List of cantatas by Christoph Graupner#GWV 1124
Gottfried Heinrich Stölzel:
- Ihr Heiligen lobsinget dem Herren (1738)

=== Annunciation (25 March) ===
Occasion
Annunciation (Mariae Verkündigung) is celebrated on 25 March, around Palm Sunday.
Readings
Isaiah 7:10–16, prophecy of the birth of the Messiah
Luke 1:26–38, the angel Gabriel announces the birth of Jesus
Hymns
"Haec est dies quam fecit Dominus"
"Herr Christ, der einig Gotts Sohn"
"Fit porta Christi pervia"
Cantatas
Georg Philipp Telemann:
- Siehe, eine Jungfrau ist schwanger, TWV 1:1326 (1716–17 cantata cycle)
- Gott will Mensch und sterblich werden, TWV 1:694 (Harmonischer Gottes-Dienst, Hamburg 1726)
- Herr Christ der ein'ge Gottessohn, TWV 1:732 (misattributed to Bach as BWV Anh. 156, BDW 01467)
Christoph Graupner:
- see List of cantatas by Christoph Graupner#GWV 1170
Johann Sebastian Bach (see also Church cantata (Bach) § Annunciation):
- Himmelskönig, sei willkommen, BWV 182 (performed on Palm Sunday 25 March 1714, 25 March 1724 and 21 March 1728)
- Wie schön leuchtet der Morgenstern, BWV 1 (chorale cantata: 1725, also Palm Sunday)
Gottfried Heinrich Stölzel:
- Fürchte dich nicht du hast Gnade bei Gott funden, H. 312
- Christus kommt her von den Vätern (1738)

=== Palm Sunday ===
Occasion
Palm Sunday (Sunday before Easter). Apart from cantatas, Passion settings such as Johann Walter's Passio Secundum Matthæum may be performed on this day.
Readings
Philippians 2:5–11, everyone be in the spirit of Christ —or— 1 Corinthians 11:23–32, of the Last Supper
Matthew 21:1–9, Entry into Jerusalem
Hymns
"Gloria, laus et honor tibi sit, Rex Christe Redemptor"
"Aus tiefer Not schrei ich zu dir"
"Christus, der uns selig macht"
"Christe, der du bist Tag und Licht" and its Latin version, "Christe qui lux es et dies"
Hymns related to the Passion of Christ (e.g. pp. 122–177 in Vopelius' Neu Leipziger Gesangbuch)
Cantatas
Georg Philipp Telemann
- Christus hat gelitten für uns, und uns, TWV 1:800 (1716–17 cantata cycle)
- Schaut die Demut Palmen tragen, TWV 1:1245 (Harmonischer Gottes-Dienst, Hamburg 1726)
- Wer ist der, so von Sodom kommt, TWV 1:1585 (opening movements reappear in the Wer ist der, so von Edom kömmt pasticcio Passion oratorio)
Christoph Graupner:
- see List of cantatas by Christoph Graupner#GWV 1125
Johann Sebastian Bach (see also Church cantata (Bach) § Palm Sunday):
- Both extant Palm Sunday cantatas by Bach (BWV 182, BWV 1) were written for Annunciation, see above, in years when Palm Sunday fell on 25 March.
Gottfried Heinrich Stölzel:
- Hosianna gelobet sei der da kommt, H. 383
Picander
- Machet die Thore weit (1728–29 libretto cycle: same libretto as for Advent I)

=== Maundy Thursday ===
Occasion
Maundy Thursday
Readings
...
Hymns
"Jesus Christus, unser Heiland, der von uns den Gotteszorn wandt"
"Wir wollen singen Heut von grossen Dingen"
"Als Jesus Christus in der Nacht"
"Ich danke dem Herrn von ganzem Herzen"
Cantatas
Christoph Graupner:
- see List of cantatas by Christoph Graupner#GWV 1126

=== Good Friday ===
Occasion
On Good Friday (sometimes indicated by its Latin name Parasceve) the Passion of Christ is commemorated. Extended Passion settings such as settings of the Brockes Passion Passion oratorio libretto, and other settings by Georg Philipp Telemann, by Johann Sebastian Bach or by his son Carl Philipp Emanuel are not usually listed as cantatas. Other Passion compositions are however sometimes indicated as Passion cantatas. Vopelius' 1682 Neu Leipziger Gesangbuch indicated Johann Walter's Passio Secundum Johannem and Jacob Handl's Ecce quomodo moritur justus motet for performance on Good Friday.
Hymns
"Da Jesus an dem Kreuze stund" and other hymns related to the Passion of Christ (e.g. pp. 122–177 in Vopelius' Neu Leipziger Gesangbuch)
Cantatas
Christoph Graupner:
- see List of cantatas by Christoph Graupner#GWV 1127
Carl Heinrich Graun
- Ein Lämmlein geht und trägt die Schuld, GraunWV B:VII:4 (c.1730; later expanded into the Wer ist der, so von Edom kömmt pasticcio)
- Der Tod Jesu (1755; this Passion libretto by Karl Wilhelm Ramler was also set by other composers)
Carl Philipp Emanuel Bach:
- Passions-Cantate, H 776 (1772 or earlier, BDW 02228)

=== Easter ===
Occasion
Easter, celebrating the Resurrection of Jesus. Music for Easter is often in the format of an Oratorio, although there are many Easter cantatas too.
Readings
1 Corinthians 5:6–8, Christ is our Easter lamb
Mark 16:1–8, Resurrection
Hymns
"Also heilig ist der Tag"
"Vita sanctorum, decus angelorum", and German "Der Heiligen Leben thut stets nach Gott streben"
"Christ lag in Todes Banden" by Luther/Johann Walter (1524: Erfurt Enchiridion and Eyn geystlich Gesangk Buchleyn), based on "Victimae paschali laudes" (text) and "Surrexit Christus hodie" (melody)
"Jesus Christus, unser Heiland, der den Tod überwand"
"Christ ist erstanden"
"Surrexit Christus hodie"
"Erstanden ist der heilige Christ"
"Erschienen ist der herrlich Tag"
"Heut triumphieret Gottes Sohn"
"Gelobt sei Gott im höchsten Thron" by Michael Weiße (1531), best known in a setting by Melchior Vulpius (1609)
Other Easter hymns, e.g. pp. 272–309 in Vopelius' Neu Leipziger Gesangbuch
Cantatas
Johann Ludwig Bach:
- Denn du wirst meine Seele nicht in der Hölle lassen, JLB 21 (21 April 1726, misattributed to J. S. Bach as BWV 15, BDW 00017)
Georg Philipp Telemann:
- Ich bin der Erste und der Letzte, TWV 1:816 (1716–17 cantata cycle)
- Ich weiß, daß mein Erlöser lebt, TWV 1:877 (1725; misattributed to J. S. Bach as BWV 160: BDW 00194)
- Weg mit Sodoms gift'gen Früchten, TWV 1:1534 (Harmonischer Gottes-Dienst, Hamburg 1726)
- Singet dem Herrn ein neues Lied, TWV 1:1344 (1761)
Christoph Graupner:
- see List of cantatas by Christoph Graupner#GWV 1128
Johann David Heinichen:
- Es lebet Jesus unser Hort (BDW 10488)
Johann Sebastian Bach (see also Church cantata (Bach) § Easter Sunday):
- Christ lag in Todes Banden, BWV 4 (chorale cantata; early version probably 24 April 1707; Leipzig version 9 April 1724 and 1 April 1725)
- Der Himmel lacht! Die Erde jubilieret, BWV 31 (Weimar version 21 April 1715; Leipzig version 9 April 1724 and 25 March 1731)
- Kommt, eilet und laufet, BWV 249 (1 April 1725: first version of the Easter Oratorio, then still a cantata BDW 00317)
Gottfried Heinrich Stölzel:
- Ich war tot und siehe ich bin lebendig, H. 325
- Lebt Christus was bin ich betrübt, H. 346
- Gott sei Dank der uns den Sieg gegeben hat, H. 435a
Gottfried August Homilius:
- Was suchet ihr den Lebendigen bei den Toten, HoWV II.66 (BDW 09435)
Wilhelm Friedemann Bach
- Erzittert und fallet, BR F 9 (BDW 09788)
Carl Philipp Emanuel Bach:
- Gott hat den Herrn auferwecket, H 803 (25 April 1756, 12 April 1757 and later; BDW 02235)
- Sing, Volk der Christen, H 808.3 (2 April 1768, 15 April 1775 and 14 April 1781; BDW 02241)
- Ist Christus nicht auferstanden, H 808.4 (1771, pasticcio BDW 02239 based on G. A. Benda's In Kedars bangen Hütten, Lor 534)
- Jauchzet, frohlocket, H 804 (18 April 1778 and 15 April 1786, pasticcio BDW 02245 based on compositions by J. S. Bach, C. H. Graun and G. A. Homilius)
- Nun danket alle Gott, H 805 (25 March 1780, BDW 02236)
- Amen, Lob und Preis und Stärke, H 834 (19 April 1783, BDW 09484)
- Gott, du wirst seine Seele, H 808.1 (30 March 1782, BDW 10623)
- Anbetung dem Erbarmer, H 807 (1784 and 1788, BDW 02260)
- Auf, mein Herz, des Herren Tag (pasticcio BDW 10584 probably realised by C. P. E. Bach; based on BWV 145, H 336.3 and TWV 1:1350)
Georg Anton Benda:
- Er ist nicht mehr, Lor 550 (Münter year-cycle 1760–61; arranged by C. P. E. Bach for performance 15 April 1770 and 4 April 1779: BDW 10619)

=== Easter Monday (Easter 2) ===
Occasion
Easter Monday, second day of Easter.
Readings
Acts 10:34–43, sermon of St. Peter
Luke 24:13–35, the road to Emmaus (Leipzig); Mark 16, the empty tomb, resurrection appearances and ascension of Jesus (Hamburg)
Hymns
See Easter
Cantatas
Johann Ludwig Bach:
- Er ist aus der Angst und Gericht genommen, JLB 10 (22 April 1726, BDW 08247)
Georg Philipp Telemann:
- Triumphierender Versöhner, tritt aus deiner Kluft hervor, TWV 1:1422 (Harmonischer Gottes-Dienst, Hamburg 1726)
Christoph Graupner:
- see List of cantatas by Christoph Graupner#GWV 1129
Johann David Heinichen:
- Einsamkeit, o stilles Wesen (BDW 09135)
Johann Sebastian Bach (see also Church cantata (Bach) § Easter Monday):
- Erfreut euch, ihr Herzen, BWV 66 (10 April 1724, 26 March 1731 and 11 April 1735)
- Bleib bei uns, denn es will Abend werden, BWV 6 (2 April 1725 and later)
Gottfried Heinrich Stölzel:
- Bleibe bei uns denn es will Abend werden, H. 326
- Gott aber sei Dank der uns den Sieg gegeben, H. 327
- Wo bist du Sonne blieben, H. 347
Picander
- Ich bin ein Pilgrim auf der Welt (1728–29 libretto cycle; fragment of a setting of this libretto by J. S. or C. P. E. Bach is known as BWV Anh. 190, BDW 01501)
Gottfried August Homilius:
- Musste nicht Christus solches leiden, HoWV II.72 (BDW 08996)

=== Easter Tuesday (Easter 3) ===
Readings
Acts 13:26–33, sermon of St. Paul in Antiochia (Leipzig); 1 Corinthians 15:50–58, resurrection of the body, "O death where is thy sting?" (Hamburg)
Luke 24:36–47, the appearance of Jesus to the Apostles in Jerusalem
Hymns
See Easter
Cantatas
Johann Ludwig Bach:
- Er machet uns lebendig, JLB 11 (23 April 1726, BDW 08195)
Georg Philipp Telemann:
- Jauchzt, ihr Christen, seid vergnügt, TWV 1:955 (Harmonischer Gottes-Dienst, Hamburg 1726)
Christoph Graupner:
- see List of cantatas by Christoph Graupner#GWV 1130
Johann Sebastian Bach (see also Church cantata (Bach) § Easter Tuesday):
- Ein Herz, das seinen Jesum lebend weiß, BWV 134 (early version: 11 April 1724; later version: 27 March 1731, and probably also 12 April 1735)
- Ich lebe, mein Herze, zu deinem Ergötzen, BWV 145 (19 April 1729; may have been composed by C. P. E. Bach and contains a chorus by Telemann, TWV 1:1350; BDW 00177)
- Der Friede sei mit dir, BWV 158 (c.1730?; incomplete?; reworked from an earlier cantata?; BDW 00192)
Gottfried Heinrich Stölzel:
- Halte im Gedächtnis Jesum Christum, H. 324
Gottfried August Homilius:
- Lobsinget dem Heiland, HoWV II.74 (three reworked versions by C. P. E. Bach: 5 April 1768, 11 April 1773 and 19 April 1778; BDW 08981 and 11057)

=== First Sunday after Easter (Quasimodogeniti) ===
Occasion
Quasimodogeniti Sunday, the second Sunday of Eastertide, or the first Sunday after Easter.
Readings
1 John 5:4–10, our faith is the victory (Leipzig); 1 John 5:1–13, obedience by Faith, the Certainty of God’s Witness (Hamburg)
John 20:19–31, the appearance of Jesus to the Disciples, first without then with Thomas, in Jerusalem
Hymns
See Easter
Cantatas
Johann Ludwig Bach:
- Wie lieblich sind auf den Bergen, JLB 6 (28 April 1726, BDW 08245)
Georg Philipp Telemann:
- Auf ehernen Mauern ruht unsrer Hoffnung Zuversicht, TWV 1:96 (Harmonischer Gottes-Dienst, Hamburg 1726)
Christoph Graupner:
- see List of cantatas by Christoph Graupner#GWV 1131
Johann Sebastian Bach (see also Church cantata (Bach) § Easter I):
- Halt im Gedächtnis Jesum Christ, BWV 67 (16 April 1724)
- Am Abend aber desselbigen Sabbats, BWV 42 (8 April 1725; 1 April 1731)
Gottfried Heinrich Stölzel:
- Der Herr wird seinem Volk Kraft geben (1738)

=== Second Sunday after Easter (Misericordias Domini) ===
Occasion
Misericordia Sunday, a.k.a. Misericordias Domini, the third Sunday of Eastertide, or the second Sunday after Easter.
Readings
1 Peter 2:21–25, Christ as a model
John 10:11–16, the Good Shepherd
Hymns
See Easter
Cantatas
Johann Ludwig Bach:
- Und ich will ihnen einen einigen Hirten, JLB 12 (5 May 1726, BDW 08300)
Georg Philipp Telemann:
- Hirt' und Bischof uns'rer Seelen, TWV 1:804b (Harmonischer Gottes-Dienst, Hamburg 1726)
Christoph Graupner:
- see List of cantatas by Christoph Graupner#GWV 1132
Johann Sebastian Bach (see also Church cantata (Bach) § Easter II):
- Du Hirte Israel, höre, BWV 104 (23 April 1724)
- Ich bin ein guter Hirt, BWV 85 (15 April 1725)
- Der Herr ist mein getreuer Hirt, BWV 112 (chorale cantata, 8 April 1731)
Gottfried August Homilius:
- Uns schützet Israels Gott, HoWV II.78 (BDW 09001 and 11059)
Gottfried Heinrich Stölzel:
- Wir dein Volk und Schafe deiner Weide (1738)

=== Third Sunday after Easter (Jubilate) ===
Occasion
Jubilate Sunday, the fourth Sunday of Eastertide, or the third Sunday after Easter.
Readings
1 Peter 2:11–20, "Submit yourselves to every ordinance of man"
John 16:16–23, Farewell Discourse, announcement of the Second Coming
Hymns
See Easter
Cantatas
Johann Ludwig Bach:
- Die mit Tränen säen, JLB 8 (12 May 1726, BDW 08290)
Georg Philipp Telemann:
- Dies ist der Gotteskinder Last, TWV 1:356 (Harmonischer Gottes-Dienst, Hamburg 1726)
Christoph Graupner:
- see List of cantatas by Christoph Graupner#GWV 1133
Johann Sebastian Bach (see also Church cantata (Bach) § Easter III):
- Weinen, Klagen, Sorgen, Zagen, BWV 12 (22 April 1714; 30 April 1724)
- Ihr werdet weinen und heulen, BWV 103 (22 April 1725; repeat performance probably 15 April 1731)
- Wir müssen durch viel Trübsal, BWV 146 (12 May 1726 or 4 May 1727?)
Gottfried Heinrich Stölzel:
- Das Warten der Gerechten wird Freude werden, H. 384

=== Fourth Sunday after Easter (Cantate) ===
Occasion
Cantate Sunday, the fifth Sunday of Eastertide, or the fourth Sunday after Easter.
Readings
James 1:17–21, "Every good gift comes from the Father of lights"
John 16:5–15, Farewell Discourse, announcement of Comforter
Hymns
See Easter
Cantatas
Johann Ludwig Bach:
- Die Weisheit kömmt nicht, JLB 14 (19 May 1726, BDW 08305)
Georg Philipp Telemann:
- Ew'ge Quelle, milder Strom, TWV 1:546 (Harmonischer Gottes-Dienst, Hamburg 1726)
Christoph Graupner:
- see List of cantatas by Christoph Graupner#GWV 1134
Johann Sebastian Bach (see also Church cantata (Bach) § Easter IV):
- Wo gehest du hin? BWV 166 (7 May 1724)
- Es ist euch gut, daß ich hingehe, BWV 108 (29 April 1725)
Gottfried Heinrich Stölzel:
- O Herr laß mich dein Angesicht oft sehen, H. 387
- Gelobet sei Gott und der Vater unsres Herrn Jesu Christi (1738)

=== Fifth Sunday after Easter (Rogate) ===
Occasion
Rogation Sunday, a.k.a. Prayer Sunday, is the sixth Sunday of Eastertide, or the fifth Sunday after Easter. It is the last Sunday before Ascension: the three days between Rogate Sunday and Ascension are known as rogation days.
Readings
James 1:22–27, doers of the word, not only listeners
John 16:23–30, Farewell Discourse, prayers will be fulfilled
Hymns
"Vater unser im Himmelreich"
Cantatas
Georg Philipp Telemann:
- Deine Toten werden leben, TWV 1:213 (Harmonischer Gottes-Dienst, Hamburg 1726) – the cantata libretto is based on Isaiah 26:19
Christoph Graupner:
- see List of cantatas by Christoph Graupner#GWV 1135
Johann Sebastian Bach (see also Church cantata (Bach) § Easter V):
- Wahrlich, wahrlich, ich sage euch, BWV 86 (14 May 1724)
- Bisher habt ihr nichts gebeten in meinem Namen, BWV 87 (6 May 1725)
Gottfried Heinrich Stölzel:
- Gelobet sei Gott der mein Gebet nicht verwirft, H. 385
- Aus der Tiefen rufe ich Herr höre meine Stimme, H. 419b

=== Ascension ===
Occasion
Feast of the Ascension, which falls on a Thursday, the fortieth day after Easter.
Readings
Acts 1:1–11, prologue, farewell and Ascension
Mark 16:14–20, Ascension
Hymns
"Nun freut euch, lieben Christen g'mein"
"Christ fuhr gen Himmel"
"Nun begehn wir das Fest", and Latin model "Festum nunc celebre"
"Nun freut euch, Gottes Kinder all"
"Gen Himmel aufgefahren ist", and Latin model "Coelos ascendit hodie"
"Christus ist heut gen Himmel gefahren", and Latin model "Ascendit Christus hodie"
Cantatas
Georg Philipp Telemann:
- Singet dem Herrn ein neues Lied, TWV 1:1343 (1725)
- Du fährest mit Jauchzen empor, TWV 1:387 (Harmonischer Gottes-Dienst, Hamburg 1726)
Christoph Graupner:
- see List of cantatas by Christoph Graupner#GWV 1136
Johann Sebastian Bach (see also Church cantata (Bach) § Ascension):
- Wer da gläubet und getauft wird, BWV 37 (18 May 1724)
- Auf Christi Himmelfahrt allein, BWV 128 (10 May 1725)
- Gott fähret auf mit Jauchzen, BWV 43 (30 May 1726)
- Lobet Gott in seinen Reichen, BWV 11 (15 May 1738?; Ascension Oratorio)
Gottfried Heinrich Stölzel:
- Ich will wiederkommen und euch zu mir nehmen, H. 331
- Der hinunter gefahren ist, H. 332
Wilhelm Friedemann Bach:
- Gott fähret auf mit Jauchzen, BR F 11 (BDW 09790)
- Wo geht die Lebensreise hin? BR F 12 (BDW 09792)
Johann Christoph Friedrich Bach:
- Groß und mächtig, stark und prächtig, Wf XIV/8 (two versions: BDW 02208 and 02209)

=== Sunday after Ascension (Exaudi) ===
Occasion
Exaudi, the Sunday after Ascension, is the seventh Sunday of Eastertide, or the sixth Sunday after Easter, a week before Pentecost
Readings
1 Peter 4:8–11, "serve each other"
John 15:26–16:4, Farewell Discourse, the promise of the Paraclete, the Spirit of Truth, and announcement of persecution (Leipzig); Matthew 20:1–16, Parable of the Workers in the Vineyard (Hamburg)
Hymns
"Ein feste Burg ist unser Gott"
"Wo Gott der Herr nicht bei uns hält"
"Wär Gott nicht mit uns diese Zeit"
"Wenn wir in höchsten Nöten sein"
Cantatas
Georg Philipp Telemann:
- Erwachet, entreißt euch den sündlichen Träumen, TWV 1:480 (Harmonischer Gottes-Dienst, Hamburg 1726)
Christoph Graupner:
- see List of cantatas by Christoph Graupner#GWV 1137
Johann Sebastian Bach (see also Church cantata (Bach) § Ascension I):
- Sie werden euch in den Bann tun, BWV 44 (21 May 1724)
- Sie werden euch in den Bann tun, BWV 183 (13 May 1725)
Gottfried Heinrich Stölzel:
- Ich danke dir daß du mich demütigest, H. 386
- Wir sind voller Angst und Plag, H. 388

=== Pentecost ===
Occasion
Pentecost (German: Pfingsten), a.k.a. Whitsun, Whit Sunday, or the first day of Pentecost (German: 1. Pfingsttag).
Readings
Acts 2:1–13, the Holy Spirit
John 14:23–31, Farewell Discourse, announcement of the Spirit who will teach
Hymns
"Komm, Heiliger Geist, Herre Gott"
"Komm, Gott Schöpfer, Heiliger Geist", and Latin model "Veni Creator Spiritus"
"Nun bitten wir den Heiligen Geist"
"Als Jesus Christus, Gottes Sohn"
"O Heiliger Geist, o heiliger Gott"
Cantatas
Georg Philipp Telemann:
- Zischet nur, stechet, ihr feurigen Zungen, TWV 1:1732 (Harmonischer Gottes-Dienst, Hamburg 1726)
- Gott der Hoffnung erfülle euch, TWV 1:634 (misattributed to J. S. Bach as BWV 218)
Christoph Graupner:
- see List of cantatas by Christoph Graupner#GWV 1138
Johann Sebastian Bach (see also Church cantata (Bach) § Pentecost Sunday):
- Erschallet, ihr Lieder, erklinget, ihr Saiten! BWV 172 (C major, Weimar: 20 May 1714; D major, first Leipzig version: 28 May 1724; C major, second Leipzig version: 13 May 1731)
- Wer mich liebet, der wird mein Wort halten, BWV 59 (28 May 1724, restaged 13 May 1731)
- Wer mich liebet, der wird mein Wort halten, BWV 74 (20 May 1725)
- O ewiges Feuer, o Ursprung der Liebe, BWV 34 (1 June 1727; 12 May 1746 in Halle, see below)
Gottfried Heinrich Stölzel:
- Die Liebe Gottes ist ausgegossen in unser Herz, H. 333
- Ich will meinen Geist ausgießen, H. 334
- Lehre mich tun nach deinem Wohlgefallen, H. 335
- Ich habe einen Held erwecket, H. 337
- Singet Gott lobsinget seinen Namen (1738)
Wilhelm Friedemann Bach:
- Wer mich liebet, der wird mein Wort halten, BR F 12 (W. F. Bach premiered this cantata 12 May 1746, together with a repeat performance of his father's BWV 34, as the start of his tenure in Halle; BDW 09795)
- Dies ist der Tag, da Jesu Leidenskraft, BR F 13 (1755–58?, BDW 09797)
- Ertönt, ihr seligen Völker, BR F 14 (based on earlier compositions, BDW 08146)
- Ach, daß du den Himmel zerrissest, BR F 16 (parody of BR F 3/F 93: BDW 09799)
Carl Philipp Emanuel Bach and Wilhelm Friedemann Bach:
- Lasset uns ablegen die Werke der Finsternis (6 June 1772 and 22 May 1779: C. P. E. Bach's reworking of W. F. Bach's BR F 1 as a cantata for Pentecost; BDW 10636)
Carl Philipp Emanuel Bach and Gottfried August Homilius:
- Herr, lehr uns tun, H 817 (13 May 1769 and 26 May 1787: pasticcio by C. P. E. Bach involving his own earlier work and a composition by Homilius; BDW 02247)
- Ihr waret weiland Finsternis (pasticcio realised in 1787? by C. P. E. Bach, based on several compositions by Homilius; BDW 10642)
- Nun ist er da (pasticcio realised in 1788 by C. P. E. Bach, based on several compositions by Homilius; BDW 10640)
Johann Friedrich Doles (see also Picander cycle of 1728–29 § Reception):
- Raset und brauset ihr hefftigen Winde (1740)

=== Pentecost Monday (Pentecost 2) ===
Occasion
Pentecost Monday (German: Pfingstmontag), a.k.a. Whit Monday or the second day of Pentecost (German: 2. Pfingsttag)
Readings
Acts 10:42–48, sermon of Peter for Cornelius
John 3:16–21, "God loved the world so much ..." from the meeting of Jesus and Nicodemus
Hymns
See Pentecost
Cantatas
Georg Philipp Telemann:
- Schmückt das frohe Fest mit Maien, TWV 1:1256 (Harmonischer Gottes-Dienst, Hamburg 1726)
Christoph Graupner:
- see List of cantatas by Christoph Graupner#GWV 1139
Johann Sebastian Bach (see also Church cantata (Bach) § Pentecost Monday):
- Also hat Gott die Welt geliebt, BWV 68 (21 May 1725)
- Erhöhtes Fleisch und Blut, BWV 173 (2 June 1727; 14 May 1731)
- Ich liebe den Höchsten von ganzem Gemüte, BWV 174 (6 June 1729)
Gottfried Heinrich Stölzel:
- Also hat Gott die Welt geliebet, H. 336
- Sehet welch eine Liebe (1738)

=== Pentecost Tuesday (Pentecost 3) ===
Occasion
Pentecost Tuesday, a.k.a. Whit Tuesday or the third day of Pentecost (German: 3. Pfingsttag)
Readings
Acts 8:14–17, the Holy Spirit in Samaria
John 10:1–10, the Good Shepherd
Hymns
See Pentecost
Cantatas
Georg Philipp Telemann:
- Ergeuß dich zur Salbung der schmachtenden Seele, TWV 1:448 (Harmonischer Gottes-Dienst, Hamburg 1726)
Christoph Graupner:
- see List of cantatas by Christoph Graupner#GWV 1140
Johann Sebastian Bach (see also Church cantata (Bach) § Pentecost Tuesday):
- Erwünschtes Freudenlicht, BWV 184 (30 May 1724; 3 June 1727; 15 May 1731)
- Er rufet seinen Schafen mit Namen, BWV 175 (22 May 1725)
Gottfried Heinrich Stölzel:
- Ich will selbst meine Schafe weiden, H. 382
- Hilf deinem Volk und segne dein Erbe (1738)

=== Trinity ===
Occasion
Trinity Sunday, last of the feasts tied to the date of Easter, is the last Sunday before the time after Trinity, or the first Sunday of the time after Pentecost.
Readings
Romans 11:33–36, depth of wisdom
John 3:1–15, the meeting of Jesus and Nicodemus
Hymns
"Gott der Vater wohn uns bei"
"Der du bist drei in Einigkeit", and Latin model "O lux beata Trinitas"
"Allein Gott in der Höh sei Ehr"
Cantatas
Georg Philipp Telemann:
- Unbegreiflich ist dein Wesen, TWV 1:1745 (Harmonischer Gottes-Dienst, Hamburg 1726)
Christoph Graupner:
- see List of cantatas by Christoph Graupner#GWV 1141
Johann Sebastian Bach (see also Church cantata (Bach) § Trinity):
- O heilges Geist- und Wasserbad, BWV 165 (16 June 1715)
- Höchsterwünschtes Freudenfest, BWV 194 (derived from a 1723 consecration cantata; as a cantata for Trinity Sunday: 4 June 1724 and 20 May 1731; alternative version, with movements in a different order: 16 June 1726)
- Es ist ein trotzig und verzagt Ding, BWV 176 (27 May 1725)
- Gelobet sei der Herr, mein Gott, BWV 129 (8 June 1727)
- Nun danket alle Gott, BWV 192 (4 June 1730)
Gottfried Heinrich Stölzel:
- Geht hin und lehret alle Völker, H. 298
- Drei sind die da zeugen im Himmel, H. 299
- O Herr dreieiniger Gott, H.364
- Heilig ist der Herr Zebaoth (1738)

=== First Sunday after Trinity (Trinity I) ===
Readings
1 John 4:16–21, God is Love
Luke 16:19–31, the parable of the Rich man and Lazarus
Hymns
"Es spricht der Unweisen Mund wohl" ("The Mouth of Fools May Say Indeed"), Luther's version of Psalm 14, sung to a melody by J. Walter (Eyn geystlich Gesangk Buchleyn 1524, Zahn No. 4436)
"Weltlich Ehr und zeitlich Gut" by Michael Weiße, melody by Valentin Triller (Zahn no. 4972, 4975)
"Es war einmal ein reicher Mann"
"Ach Gott thu dich erbarmen"
"Kommt her zu mir spricht Gottes Sohn"
Cantatas
Philipp Heinrich Erlebach
- Gelobet sei der Herr täglich (c. 1710)
Georg Philipp Telemann:
- Verlöschet, ihr Funken der irdischen Liebe, TWV 1:1471 (Harmonischer Gottes-Dienst, Hamburg 1726)
Christoph Graupner:
- see List of cantatas by Christoph Graupner#GWV 1142
Johann Sebastian Bach (see also Church cantata (Bach) § Trinity I):
- Die Elenden sollen essen, BWV 75 (30 May 1723; first cantata of Bach's first cantata cycle)
- O Ewigkeit, du Donnerwort, BWV 20 (chorale cantata, 11 June 1724; first cantata of the chorale cantata cycle)
- Brich dem Hungrigen dein Brot, BWV 39 (23 June 1726)
Gottfried Heinrich Stölzel:
- Wohl zu tun und mitzuteilen (1738)

=== Second Sunday after Trinity (Trinity II) ===
Readings
1 John 3:13–18: whoever doesn't love, remains in Death
Luke 14:16–24: parable of the great banquet
Hymns
"Ich ruf zu dir, Herr Jesu Christ"
"Ach Gott, vom Himmel sieh darein" (Luther, first published in Achtliederbuch 1724)
"Wie schön leuchtet der Morgenstern"
"Wachet auf, ruft uns die Stimme"
"Es spricht der Unweisen Mund wohl"
Cantatas
Johann Ludwig Bach:
- Kommet, es ist alles bereit, JLB deest (1719 or earlier, BDW 08954)
Georg Philipp Telemann:
- Stille die Tränen des winselnden Armen, TWV 1:1401 (Harmonischer Gottes-Dienst, 1726)
Christoph Graupner:
- see List of cantatas by Christoph Graupner#GWV 1143
Johann Sebastian Bach (see also Church cantata (Bach) § Trinity II):
- Die Himmel erzählen die Ehre Gottes, BWV 76 (6 June 1723)
- Ach Gott, vom Himmel sieh darein, BWV 2 (chorale cantata, 18 June 1724)
Gottfried Heinrich Stölzel:
- Befiehl dem Herrn deine Wege, H. 320
- Ach ich fühle keine Reue, H.365
- Schmecket und sehet wie freundlich der Herr ist (1738)

=== St. John's Day (24 June) ===
Occasion
The Feast of John the Baptist (Johannistag), remembering the birth of John the Baptist, is celebrated on 24 June, around the third Sunday after Trinity.
Readings
Isaiah 40:1–5, the voice of a preacher in the desert
Luke 1:57–80, the birth of John the Baptist and the Benedictus of Zechariah
Hymns
"Herr Christ, der einig Gotts Sohn"
"Gelobet sei der Herr der Gott Israel" and Latin model "Benedictus Dominus Deus Israel"
"Christ unser Herr zum Jordan kam"
Cantatas
Johann Ludwig Bach:
- Siehe, ich will meinen Engel senden, JLB 17 (1726, BDW 08310)
Georg Philipp Telemann:
- Singet dem Herrn ein neues Lied, TWV 1:1345 (c. 1723 or earlier)
- Die Kinder des Höchsten sind rufende Stimmen, TWV 1:349 (Harmonischer Gottes-Dienst, 1726)
Johann Sebastian Bach:
- Ihr Menschen, rühmet Gottes Liebe, BWV 167 (1723)
- Christ unser Herr zum Jordan kam, BWV 7 (chorale cantata, 1724)
- Freue dich, erlöste Schar, BWV 30 (1738)
- Lobt ihn mit Herz und Munde, BWV 220 (doubtful)
Gottfried Heinrich Stölzel:
- Schreib meinen Nam' aufs beste ins Buch des Lebens ein, H. 380
- Stimmt an mit vollen Chören, H. 381
- Gelobet sei der Herr der Gott Israel (1738)
Wilhelm Friedemann Bach
- Es ist eine Stimme eines Predigers, BR F 16 (BDW 09801)
Johann Gottlieb Goldberg:
- Durch die herzliche Barmherzigkeit (1745–46, BDW 09155)

=== Third Sunday after Trinity (Trinity III) ===
Readings
1 Peter 5:6–11, Cast thy burden upon the Lord
Luke 15:1–10, parable of the Lost Sheep and parable of the Lost Coin
Hymns
"Erbarm dich mein, o Herre Gott"
"Wo soll ich fliehen hin"
"O Herre Gott, begnade mich"
"Allein zu dir, Herr Jesu Christ"
Cantatas
Georg Philipp Telemann:
- Wer sehnet sich nach Kerker, Stein und Ketten, TWV 1:1594 (Harmonischer Gottes-Dienst, 1726)
Christoph Graupner:
- see List of cantatas by Christoph Graupner#GWV 1144
Johann Sebastian Bach (see also Church cantata (Bach) § Trinity III):
- Ich hatte viel Bekümmernis, BWV 21 (C minor, Weimar: 17 June 1714; D minor, Köthen/Hamburg: 1720; C minor, Leipzig: 13 June 1723)
- Ach Herr, mich armen Sünder, BWV 135 (25 June 1724)
Gottfried Heinrich Stölzel:
- Es wird Freude sein vor den Engeln Gottes, H. 302
- Das ist je gewißlich wahr, H. 303
- Ach was soll ich Sünder machen, H.366
- O wie ist die Barmherzigkeit des Herrn so groß (1738)

=== Fourth Sunday after Trinity (Trinity IV) ===
Readings
Romans 8:18–23, "For the earnest expectation of the creature waiteth for the manifestation of the sons of God."
Luke 6:36–42, Sermon on the Mount: be merciful, judge not
Hymns
"Dies sind die heilgen zehn Gebot"
"Mensch, willst du leben seliglich"
"O Mensch wiltu vor Gott bestahn"
Cantatas
Georg Philipp Telemann:
- Ihr seligen Stunden erquickender Freude, TWV 1:917 (Harmonischer Gottes-Dienst, 1726)
Christoph Graupner:
- see List of cantatas by Christoph Graupner#GWV 1145
Johann Sebastian Bach (see also Church cantata (Bach) § Trinity IV):
- Barmherziges Herze der ewigen Liebe, BWV 185 (14 July 1715; 20 June 1723)
- Ein ungefärbt Gemüte, BWV 24 (20 June 1723)
- Ich ruf zu dir, Herr Jesu Christ, BWV 177 (chorale cantata, 6 July 1732)
Gottfried Heinrich Stölzel:
- Du Vater bist voll Güte, H.367
- Wer Barmherzigkeit übet (1738)

=== Fifth Sunday after Trinity (Trinity V) ===
Readings
1 Peter 3:8–15 "Sanctify the Lord God in your hearts"
Luke 5:1–11, Peter's great catch of fish
Hymns
"Wär Gott nicht mit uns diese Zeit"
"Ich ruf zu dir, Herr Jesu Christ"
"Vater unser im Himmelreich"
"Wo Gott zum Haus nicht gibt sein Gunst"
Cantatas
Georg Philipp Telemann:
- Begnadigte Seelen gesegneter Christen, TWV 1:119 (Harmonischer Gottes-Dienst, 1726)
Christoph Graupner:
- see List of cantatas by Christoph Graupner#GWV 1146
Johann Sebastian Bach (see also Church cantata (Bach) § Trinity V):
- Wer nur den lieben Gott läßt walten, BWV 93 (chorale cantata, 9 July 1724)
- Siehe, ich will viel Fischer aussenden, BWV 88 (21 July 1726)
Gottfried Heinrich Stölzel:
- Des Herren Segen machet reich, H.368
- Gott segnet den Frommen ihre Güter (1738)

=== Visitation (2 July) ===
Occasion
Feast of Visitation, celebrated on 2 July (around the sixth Sunday after Trinity)
Readings
Isaiah 11:1–5, prophecy of the Messiah
Luke 1:39–56, Mary, pregnant of Jesus, visits Elizabeth, pregnant of John the Baptist – includes Mary's song of praise, Magnificat, Luke 1:46–55
Hymns and canticles
"Herr Christ, der einig Gotts Sohn"
"Meine Seele erhebt den Herren" and Latin model "Magnificat anima mea Dominum"
"Nun freut euch, lieben Christen g'mein"
Cantatas, including Magnificat settings performed as Visitation cantata
Johann Ludwig Bach:
- Der Herr wird ein Neues im Lande, JLB 13 (1726, BDW 08303)
Georg Philipp Telemann:
- Gottlob, die Frucht hat sich gezeiget, TWV 1:670 (Harmonischer Gottes-Dienst, Hamburg 1726)
- Meine Seele erhebt den Herrn, TWV 1:1104, 1:1107 and 1:1108
Christoph Graupner:
- see List of cantatas by Christoph Graupner#GWV 1171 and GWV 1172
Johann Sebastian Bach (see also Church cantata (Bach) § Visitation):
- Herz und Mund und Tat und Leben, BWV 147 (1723, adaptation of BWV 147a)
- Magnificat, BWV 243a (early version without Christmas interpolations possibly first performed on 2 July 1723)
- Meine Seel erhebt den Herren, BWV 10 (chorale cantata: 1724)
- Meine Seele erhebet den Herrn (cantata text by an unknown librettist without extant composition by Bach: 2 July 1725, BDW 01672)
- Magnificat, BWV 243 (D major version: 2 July 1733?)
Melchior Hoffmann (formerly attributed to Johann Sebastian Bach):
- Meine Seele rühmt und preist, BWV 189 (BDW 00229)
- Meine Seel erhebt den Herren, BWV Anh. 21, formerly attributed to Bach (BDW 01329), and then Telemann
Gottfried Heinrich Stölzel:
- Lobt ihn mit Herz und Munde, H. 379
- Preiset mit mir den Herrn (1738)
Wilhelm Friedemann Bach:
- Der Herr wird mit Gerechtigkeit, BR F 18 (BDW 09803)
Carl Philipp Emanuel Bach:
- Meine Seele erhebt den Herrn (1768, BDW 02246)

=== Sixth Sunday after Trinity (Trinity VI) ===
Readings
Romans 6:3–11, "By Christ's death we are dead for sin"
Matthew 5:20–26, Sermon on the Mount: better justice
Hymns
"Es ist das Heil uns kommen her"
"Durch Adams Fall ist ganz verderbt"
"Mensch, willst du leben seliglich"
"Dies sind die heilgen zehn Gebot"
"Ich ruf zu dir, Herr Jesu Christ"
Cantatas
Johann Ludwig Bach:
- Ich will meinen Geist, JLB 7 (28 July 1726, BDW 08226)
Georg Philipp Telemann:
- Ich bin getauft in Christi Tode, TWV 1:820 (Harmonischer Gottes-Dienst, 1726)
Christoph Graupner:
- see List of cantatas by Christoph Graupner#GWV 1147
Johann Sebastian Bach (see also Church cantata (Bach) § Trinity VI):
- Vergnügte Ruh, beliebte Seelenlust, BWV 170 (28 July 1726)
- Es ist das Heil uns kommen her, BWV 9 (chorale cantata, 1 August 1734)
Gottfried Heinrich Stölzel:
- Verleih daß ich aus Herzensgrund, H.369
- Sprich nicht ich will Böses vergelten (1738)

=== Seventh Sunday after Trinity (Trinity VII) ===
Readings
Romans 6:19–23, "the wages of sin is death; but the gift of God is eternal life"
Mark 8:1–9, The Feeding of the 4000
Hymns
"Nun lob, mein Seel, den Herren"
"Vater unser im Himmelreich"
"Warum betrübst du dich, mein Herz"
"Wohl dem, der in Gottesfurcht steht"
Cantatas
Georg Philipp Telemann:
- Wenn Israel am Nilusstrande, TWV 1:1562 (Harmonischer Gottes-Dienst, 1726)
Christoph Graupner:
- see List of cantatas by Christoph Graupner#GWV 1148
Johann Sebastian Bach (see also Church cantata (Bach) § Trinity VII):
- Ärgre dich, o Seele, nicht, BWV 186 (11 July 1723)
- Was willst du dich betrüben, BWV 107 (chorale cantata, 23 July 1724)
- Es wartet alles auf dich, BWV 187 (4 August 1726)
Gottfried Heinrich Stölzel:
- O Herr gib uns ein fruchtbar Jahr, H.370
- Wenn du 'gessen hast und satt bist (1738)
Carl Heinrich Graun and Carl Philipp Emanuel Bach
- Der Himmel allenthalben (C. P. E. Bach's 1774 parody of C. H. Graun's GraunWV B:VIII:1; BDW 02240)
Wilhelm Friedemann Bach
- Verhängnis, dein Wüten entkräftet die Armen, BR F 22 (24 July 1757, BDW 09447)

=== Eighth Sunday after Trinity (Trinity VIII) ===
Readings
Romans 8:12–17, "For as many as are led by the Spirit of God, they are the sons of God"
Matthew 7:15–23, Sermon on the Mount: warning of false prophets
Hymns
"Ach Gott, vom Himmel sieh darein"
"Ich ruf zu dir, Herr Jesu Christ"
"O Herre Gott, dein göttlich Wort"
Cantatas
Georg Philipp Telemann:
- Weicht, ihr Sünden, bleibt dahinten, TWV 1:1538 (Harmonischer Gottes-Dienst, 1726)
Christoph Graupner:
- see List of cantatas by Christoph Graupner#GWV 1149
Johann Sebastian Bach (see also Church cantata (Bach) § Trinity VIII):
- Erforsche mich, Gott, und erfahre mein Herz, BWV 136 (18 June 1723)
- Wo Gott der Herr nicht bei uns hält, BWV 178 (chorale cantata, 30 July 1724)
- Es ist dir gesagt, Mensch, was gut ist, BWV 45 (11 August 1726)
Gottfried Heinrich Stölzel:
- Es werden nicht alle die zu mir sagen, H. 304
- Wende meine Augen ab, H. 328
- Wie wenig sind der Heilgen dein, H.371
- Die Lehrer werden mit viel Segen geschmückt (1738)
Carl Philipp Emanuel Bach:
- Zeige du mir deine Wege, H 832 (incomplete, BDW 02248)

=== Ninth Sunday after Trinity (Trinity IX) ===
Readings
1 Corinthians 10:6–13, warning of false gods, consolation in temptation
Luke 16:1–9, parable of the Unjust Steward
Hymns
"Durch Adams Fall ist ganz verderbt"
"Menschenkind, merk eben"
"Es spricht der Unweisen Mund wohl"
"Weltlich Ehr und zeitlich Gut"
"Warum betrübst du dich, mein Herz"
Cantatas
Georg Philipp Telemann:
- Das Wetter rührt mit Strahl und Blitzen, TWV 1:199 (Harmonischer Gottes-Dienst, 1726)
Christoph Graupner:
- see List of cantatas by Christoph Graupner#GWV 1150
Johann Sebastian Bach (see also Church cantata (Bach) § Trinity IX):
- Herr, gehe nicht ins Gericht mit deinem Knecht, BWV 105 (25 July 1723)
- Was frag ich nach der Welt, BWV 94 (chorale cantata, 6 August 1724)
- Tue Rechnung! Donnerwort, BWV 168 (29 July 1725)
Gottfried Heinrich Stölzel:
- Herr gehe nicht ins Gericht, H. 305
- Tue Rechnung von deinem Haushalten, H. 323
- Erbarm dich mein o Herre Gott, H.372
- Vergib uns alle Sünde und tue uns wohl (1738)

=== Tenth Sunday after Trinity (Trinity X) ===
Readings
1 Corinthians 12:1–11, different gifts, but one spirit
Luke 19:41–48, Jesus announces the destruction of Jerusalem, Cleansing of the Temple
Hymns
"An Wasserflüssen Babylon"
"Ach lieben Christen seid getrost"
Cantatas
Georg Philipp Telemann:
- Kein Vogel kann im weiten Fliegen, TWV 1:994 (Harmonischer Gottes-Dienst, 1726)
Christoph Graupner:
- see List of cantatas by Christoph Graupner#GWV 1151
Johann Sebastian Bach (see also Church cantata (Bach) § Trinity X):
- Schauet doch und sehet, ob irgend ein Schmerz sei, BWV 46 (1 August 1723)
- Nimm von uns, Herr, du treuer Gott, BWV 101 (chorale cantata, 13 August 1724)
- Herr, deine Augen sehen nach dem Glauben, BWV 102 (25 August 1726; reworked version by C. P. E. Bach: 11 August 1776, 3 August 1777, 19 August 1781 and 20 August 1786, BDW 10542)
Gottfried Heinrich Stölzel:
- Nimm von uns Herr du treuer Gott, H.373
- So wasche nun Jerusalem dein Herz (1738)
Wilhelm Friedemann Bach
- Ach Gott, vom Himmel sieh darein (Heraus, verblendender Hochmut), BR F 18 (BDW 09805)

=== 11th Sunday after Trinity (Trinity XI) ===
Readings
1 Corinthians 15:1–10, on the gospel of Christ and his (Paul's) duty as an apostle
Luke 18:9–14, parable of the Pharisee and the Tax Collector
Hymns
"Erbarm dich mein, o Herre Gott"
"O Herre Gott, begnade mich"
"Allein zu dir, Herr Jesu Christ"
"Es ist das Heil uns kommen her"
"Aus tiefer Not schrei ich zu dir"
"Vater unser im Himmelreich"
Cantatas
Johann Ludwig Bach:
- Durch sein Erkenntnis, JLB 15 (1 September 1726, BDW 08308)
Georg Philipp Telemann:
- Durchsuche dich, o stolzer Geist, TWV 1:399 (Harmonischer Gottes-Dienst, 1726)
Christoph Graupner:
- see List of cantatas by Christoph Graupner#GWV 1152
Johann Sebastian Bach (see also Church cantata (Bach) § Trinity XI):
- Mein Herze schwimmt im Blut, BWV 199 (Weimar version in C minor: 12 August 1714; Köthen version in D minor; Leipzig version in D minor: 8 August 1723)
- Siehe zu, daß deine Gottesfurcht nicht Heuchelei sei, BWV 179 (8 August 1723)
- Herr Jesu Christ, du höchstes Gut, BWV 113 (chorale cantata, 20 August 1724)
Gottfried Heinrich Stölzel:
- Es ist hie kein Unterschied sie sind allzumal Sünder, H. 301
- Wer seine Missetat leugnet, H. 319
- Wie dürft' ich bitten wenn mein Sinn, H.374

=== 12th Sunday after Trinity (Trinity XII) ===
Readings
2 Corinthians 3:4–11, the ministration of the Spirit
Mark 7:31–37, the healing of a deaf mute man
Hymns
"Nun lob, mein Seel, den Herren"
"Durch Adams Fall ist ganz verderbt"
"Nun freut euch, lieben Christen g'mein"
"Herr Gott, dich loben wir"
Cantatas
Georg Philipp Telemann:
- Ihr, deren Leben mit banger Finsternis umgeben, TWV 1:897 (Harmonischer Gottes-Dienst, 1726)
Christoph Graupner:
- see List of cantatas by Christoph Graupner#GWV 1153
Johann Sebastian Bach (see also Church cantata (Bach) § Trinity XII):
- Lobe den Herrn, meine Seele, BWV 69a (15 August 1723)
- Lobe den Herren, den mächtigen König der Ehren, BWV 137 (chorale cantata, 19 August 1725)
- Geist und Seele wird verwirret, BWV 35 (8 September 1726)
Gottfried Heinrich Stölzel:
- Er hat alles wohl gemacht, H. 311
- Ihn laßt tun und walten, H.375
- Ich danke dir Gott ewiglich (1738)

=== 13th Sunday after Trinity (Trinity XIII) ===
Readings
Galatians 3:15–22, law and promise
Luke 10:23–37, parable of the Good Samaritan
Hymns
"Nun freut euch, lieben Christen g'mein"
"Dies sind die heilgen zehn Gebot"
"Es ist das Heil uns kommen her"
"O Herre Gott, begnade mich"
"Erbarm dich mein, o Herre Gott"
Cantatas
Johann Ludwig Bach:
- Ich aber ging für dir über, JLB 16 (15 September 1726, BDW 08229)
- Du sollst lieben Gott deinen Herrn, JLB 24 (BDW 11030)
Georg Philipp Telemann:
- Deines neuen Bundes Gnade, TWV 1:212 (Harmonischer Gottes-Dienst, 1726)
Christoph Graupner:
- see List of cantatas by Christoph Graupner#GWV 1154
Johann Sebastian Bach (see also Church cantata (Bach) § Trinity XIII):
- Du sollt Gott, deinen Herren, lieben, BWV 77 (22 August 1723)
- Allein zu dir, Herr Jesu Christ, BWV 33 (chorale cantata, 3 September 1724)
- Ihr, die ihr euch von Christo nennet, BWV 164 (26 August 1725)
Gottfried Heinrich Stölzel:
- Meister was muß ich tun, H. 306
- Du sollt Gott deinen Herren lieben, H. 307
- Heil du mich lieber Herre, H.376
- Ich danke dir von rechtem Herzen (1738)
Carl Friedrich Christian Fasch and Carl Philipp Emanuel Bach:
- Wer meine Gebote hat (C. P. E. Bach's reworking of a cantata by Fasch, BDW 10574)

=== 14th Sunday after Trinity (Trinity XIV) ===
Readings
Galatians 5:16–24, works of the flesh, fruit of the Spirit
Luke 17:11–19, Cleansing ten lepers
Hymns
"Erbarm dich mein, o Herre Gott"
"Durch Adams Fall ist ganz verderbt"
"Nun lob, mein Seel, den Herren"
"Vater unser im Himmelreich"
"Ich danke dem Herrn von ganzem Herzen"
"Fröhlich wollen wir Alleluja singen"
Cantatas
Georg Philipp Telemann:
- Schau nach Sodom nicht zurücke, TWV 1:1243 (Harmonischer Gottes-Dienst, 1726)
Christoph Graupner:
- see List of cantatas by Christoph Graupner#GWV 1155
Johann Sebastian Bach (see also Church cantata (Bach) § Trinity XIV):
- Es ist nichts Gesundes an meinem Leibe, BWV 25 (29 August 1723)
- Jesu, der du meine Seele, BWV 78 (chorale cantata, 10 September 1724; restaged after 1735)
- Wer Dank opfert, der preiset mich, BWV 17 (22 September 1726)
Gottfried Heinrich Stölzel:
- Opfere Gott Dank (1738)

=== 15th Sunday after Trinity (Trinity XV) ===
Readings
Galatians 5:25–6:10, admonition to "walk in the Spirit"
Matthew 6:23–34, Sermon on the Mount: do not worry about material needs, but seek God's kingdom first
Hymns
"Vater unser im Himmelreich"
"Warum betrübst du dich, mein Herz"
"Verzage nicht, o frommer Christ"
"Der Herr ist mein getreuer Hirt"
Cantatas
Georg Philipp Telemann:
- Trifft menschlich und voll Fehler sein die meiste zeit zusammen, TWV 1:1417 (Harmonischer Gottes-Dienst, 1726)
Christoph Graupner:
- see List of cantatas by Christoph Graupner#GWV 1156
Johann Sebastian Bach (see also Church cantata (Bach) § Trinity XV):
- Warum betrübst du dich, mein Herz, BWV 138 (5 September 1723)
- Was Gott tut, das ist wohlgetan, BWV 99 (chorale cantata, 17 September 1724)
- Jauchzet Gott in allen Landen, BWV 51 (17 September 1730)
Gottfried Heinrich Stölzel:
- Die da reich werden wollen, H. 308
- Niemand kann zweien Herren dienen, H. 309
- Was betrübst du dich meine Seele (1738)

=== 16th Sunday after Trinity (Trinity XVI) ===
Readings
Ephesians 3:13–21, Paul praying for the strengthening of faith in the congregation of Ephesus
Luke 7:11–17, Raising of the Young man from Nain
Hymns
"Mitten wir im Leben sind"
"Wenn wir in höchsten Nöten sein"
Cantatas
Georg Philipp Telemann:
- Die stärkende Wirkung des Geistes, TWV 1:363 (Harmonischer Gottes-Dienst, 1726)
Christoph Graupner:
- see List of cantatas by Christoph Graupner#GWV 1157
Johann Sebastian Bach (see also Church cantata (Bach) § Trinity XVI):
- Komm, du süße Todesstunde, BWV 161 (6 October 1715 or 27 September 1716)
- Christus, der ist mein Leben, BWV 95 (12 September 1723)
- Liebster Gott, wenn werd ich sterben? BWV 8 (chorale cantata, 24 September 1724, second version 17 September 1747)
- Wer weiß, wie nahe mir mein Ende? BWV 27 (6 October 1726)
Gottfried Heinrich Stölzel:
- Herr lehre doch mich daß es ein Ende, H. 310
- Wer weiß wie nahe mir mein Ende, H.377
Carl Philipp Emanuel Bach:
- Der Gerechte, ob er gleich zu zeitlich stirbt, H 818 (27 November 1774: pasticcio with movements by Johann Christoph Bach and G. A. Benda, BDW 08590)
Carl Friedrich Christian Fasch and Carl Philipp Emanuel Bach:
- Die mit Tränen säen (C. P. E. Bach's reworking of a cantata by Fasch, BDW 10769)

=== 17th Sunday after Trinity (Trinity XVII) ===
Readings
Ephesians 4:1–6, admonition to keep the unity of the Spirit
Luke 14:1–11, Healing a man with dropsy on the Sabbath
Hymns
"Nun freut euch, lieben Christen g'mein"
"Wo Gott der Herr nicht bei uns hält"
Cantatas
Heinrich Bach:
- Ich danke dir, Gott, ABA II, 1 (BDW 08787)
Georg Philipp Telemann:
- Umschlinget uns, ihr sanften Friedensbande, TWV 1:1426 (Harmonischer Gottes-Dienst, 1726)
- Erwäg', o Mensch, TWV 1:487 b (Fortsetzung des Harmonischen Gottes-Dienstes, 1732)
Christoph Graupner:
- see List of cantatas by Christoph Graupner#GWV 1158
Johann Sebastian Bach (see also Church cantata (Bach) § Trinity XVII):
- Bringet dem Herrn Ehre seines Namens, BWV 148 (19 September 1723)
- Ach, lieben Christen, seid getrost, BWV 114 (chorale cantata, 1 October 1724)
- Wer sich selbst erhöhet, der soll erniedriget werden, BWV 47 (13 October 1726)

=== St. Michael's Day (29 September) ===
Occasion
St. Michael's Day, a.k.a. Michaelmas (German: Michaelisfest) is celebrated on 29 September, around the 17th Sunday after Trinity.
Readings
Revelation 12:7–12, fight of Michael with the dragon
Matthew 18:1–11, heaven belongs to the children, the angels see the face of God
Hymns
"Dicimus grates tibi" and German derivatives "Herr Gott, dich loben alle wir" and "Laßt uns von Herzen danken Gott dem Herren"
"Es stehn für Gottes Throne"
"Fürst und Herr der starken Helden"
Cantatas
Georg Philipp Telemann:
- Packe dich, gelähmter Drache, TWV 1:1222 (Harmonischer Gottes-Dienst, 1726)
- Siehe, es hat überwunden der Löwe, TWV 1:1328 (misattributed to Bach as BWV 219)
Johann Sebastian Bach (see also Church cantata (Bach) § St. Michael's Day):
- Herr Gott, dich loben alle wir, BWV 130 (chorale cantata, 1724, and later version with slightly modified instrumentation)
- Es erhub sich ein Streit, BWV 19 (1726)
- Man singet mit Freuden vom Sieg, BWV 149 (1728 or 1729)
- Nun ist das Heil und die Kraft, BWV 50 (year and purpose unknown: movement of an incomplete or lost cantata, possibly for Michaelmas)
Gottfried Heinrich Stölzel:
- Der Engel des Herrn lagert sich, H. 314
- Sie sind allzumal dienstbare Geister, H. 315
- Widerstehet dem Teufel, H. 316
Carl Philipp Emanuel Bach:
- Den Engeln gleich, H 809 (1769 and 1774, BDW 02238)
- Es erhub sich ein Streit (1770, 1776 and 1781, pasticcios involving J. S. Bach's BWV 19 and G. A. Benda's L 597 and 544, BDW 10303)
- Ich will den Namen des Herrn preisen, H 810 (1772, 1777, 1782 and 1786, pasticcio involving G. A. Benda's L 603, BDW 02243)
- Siehe, ich begehre deiner Befehle, H 812 (1775, BDW 02242)
- Wenn Christus seine Kirche schützt (1778 and 1784, pasticcio involving J. C. F. Bach's Wf XIV/6 and music by G. A. Benda, BDW 01914)
- Der Frevler mag die Wahrheit schmähn, H 814 (1785, pasticcio involving a movement of J. C. F. Bach's Wf XIV/5, BDW 02244)
Johann Christoph Friedrich Bach:
- Wie wird uns werden, Wf XIV/5 (1771, BDW 01917)

=== 18th Sunday after Trinity (Trinity XVIII) ===
Readings
1 Corinthians 1:4–8, Paul's thanks for grace of God in Ephesus
Matthew 22:34–46, the Great Commandment
Hymns
"Herr Christ, der einig Gotts Sohn"
"Dies sind die heilgen zehn Gebot"
"Es ist das Heil uns kommen her"
"Nun freut euch, lieben Christen g'mein"
Cantatas
Georg Philipp Telemann:
- Ich schaue bloß auf Gottes Güte, TWV 1:859 (Harmonischer Gottes-Dienst, 1726)
Christoph Graupner:
- see List of cantatas by Christoph Graupner#GWV 1159
Johann Sebastian Bach (see also Church cantata (Bach) § Trinity XVIII):
- Herr Christ, der einge Gottessohn, BWV 96 (chorale cantata, 8 October 1724 and 24 October 1734)
- Gott soll allein mein Herze haben, BWV 169 (20 October 1726)

=== 19th Sunday after Trinity (Trinity XIX) ===
Readings
Ephesians 4:22–28, "put on the new man, which after God is created"
Matthew 9:1–8, Healing the paralytic at Capernaum
Hymns
"Ich ruf zu dir, Herr Jesu Christ"
"Aus tiefer Not schrei ich zu dir"
"Nun lob, mein Seel, den Herren"
"Aus tiefer Not laßt uns zu Gott"
"O Herre Gott, begnade mich"
Cantatas
Georg Philipp Telemann:
- Es ist ein schlechter Ruhm, TWV 1:506 (Harmonischer Gottes-Dienst, 1726)
Christoph Graupner:
- see List of cantatas by Christoph Graupner#GWV 1160
Johann Sebastian Bach (see also Church cantata (Bach) § Trinity XIX):
- Ich elender Mensch, wer wird mich erlösen, BWV 48 (3 October 1723)
- Wo soll ich fliehen hin, BWV 5 (chorale cantata, 15 October 1724)
- Ich will den Kreuzstab gerne tragen, BWV 56 (27 October 1726)

=== 20th Sunday after Trinity (Trinity XX) ===
Readings
Ephesians 5:15–21, "walk circumspectly, ... filled with the Spirit"
Matthew 22:1–14, parable of the great banquet
Hymns
"Ach Gott, vom Himmel sieh darein"
"Es spricht der Unweisen Mund wohl"
"Wo Gott der Herr nicht bei uns hält"
"Wie schön leuchtet der Morgenstern"
"Wachet auf, ruft uns die Stimme"
"Fröhlich wollen wir Alleluja singen"
Cantatas
Georg Philipp Telemann:
- Die Ehre des herrlichen Schöpfers zu melden, TWV 1:334 (Harmonischer Gottes-Dienst, 1726)
Christoph Graupner:
- see List of cantatas by Christoph Graupner#GWV 1161
Johann Sebastian Bach (see also Church cantata (Bach) § Trinity XX):
- Ach! ich sehe, itzt, da ich zur Hochzeit gehe, BWV 162 (25 October 1716 and 10 October 1723)
- Schmücke dich, o liebe Seele, BWV 180 (chorale cantata, 22 October 1724)
- Ich geh und suche mit Verlangen, BWV BWV 49 (3 November 1726)
Carl Philipp Emanuel Bach:
- In deinem Schmuck gehen der Könige Töchter, H 818.5 (pasticcio, BDW 09597)

=== 21st Sunday after Trinity (Trinity XXI) ===
Readings
Ephesians 6:10–17, "take unto you the whole armour of God"
John 4:46–54, healing the nobleman's son
Hymns
"Ich ruf zu dir, Herr Jesu Christ"
"Aus tiefer Not schrei ich zu dir"
"Herr Christ, der einig Gotts Sohn"
"Allein zu dir, Herr Jesu Christ"
Cantatas
Georg Philipp Telemann:
- Ich will den Kreuzweg gerne gehen, TWV 1:884
- Verfolgter Geist, wohin? TWV 1:1467 (Harmonischer Gottes-Dienst, 1726)
Christoph Graupner:
- see List of cantatas by Christoph Graupner#GWV 1162
Johann Sebastian Bach (see also Church cantata (Bach) § Trinity XXI):
- Ich glaube, lieber Herr, hilf meinem Unglauben, BWV 109 (17 October 1723)
- Aus tiefer Not schrei ich zu dir, BWV 38 (chorale cantata, 29 October 1724)
- Was Gott tut, das ist wohlgetan, BWV 98 (10 November 1726)
- Ich habe meine Zuversicht, BWV 188 (17 October 1728)

=== 22nd Sunday after Trinity (Trinity XXII) ===
Readings
Philippians 1:3–11, Thanks and prayer for the congregation in Philippi
Matthew 18:23–35, parable of the unforgiving servant
Hymns
"Erbarm dich mein, o Herre Gott"
"O Herre Gott, begnade mich"
"Aus tiefer Not schrei ich zu dir"
"Allein zu dir, Herr Jesu Christ"
"Vater unser im Himmelreich"
"Ich ruf zu dir, Herr Jesu Christ"
Cantatas
Georg Philipp Telemann:
- Erhalte mich, o Herr, in deinem Werke, TWV 1:449 (Harmonischer Gottes-Dienst, 1726)
Christoph Graupner:
- see List of cantatas by Christoph Graupner#GWV 1163
Johann Sebastian Bach (see also Church cantata (Bach) § Trinity XXII):
- Was soll ich aus dir machen, Ephraim, BWV 89 (24 October 1723)
- Mache dich, mein Geist, bereit, BWV 115 (chorale cantata, 5 November 1724)
- Ich armer Mensch, ich Sündenknecht, BWV 55 (17 November 1726)
Gottfried Heinrich Stölzel:
- Seid barmherzig wie auch euer Vater barmherzig ist, H. 318

=== Reformation Day (31 October) ===
Occasion
Reformation Day is celebrated on 31 October, around a month before the end of the liturgical year.
Readings
2 Thessalonians 2:3–8, be steadfast against adversaries
Revelation 14:6–8, fear God and honour him
Cantatas
Christoph Graupner:
- see List of cantatas by Christoph Graupner#GWV 1173
Johann Sebastian Bach (see also Church cantata (Bach) § Reformation Day):
- Gott der Herr ist Sonn und Schild, BWV 79 (1725)
- Ein feste Burg ist unser Gott, BWV 80 (chorale cantata, two versions: 1727–31?)

=== 23rd Sunday after Trinity (Trinity XXIII) ===
Readings
Philippians 3:17–21, "our conversation is in heaven"
Matthew 22:15–22, the question about paying taxes, answered by Render unto Caesar...
Hymns
"Ein feste Burg ist unser Gott"
"Wo Gott der Herr nicht bei uns hält"
"Wer nicht sitzt im Gottlosen Rat"
"Wär Gott nicht mit uns diese Zeit"
Cantatas
Georg Philipp Telemann:
- Singet dem Herrn ein neues Lied, TWV 1:1342 (1724; only text extant)
- Locke nur, Erde, mit schmeichelndem Reize, TWV 1:1069 (Harmonischer Gottes-Dienst, 1726)
Christoph Graupner:
- see List of cantatas by Christoph Graupner#GWV 1164
Johann Sebastian Bach (see also Church cantata (Bach) § Trinity XXIII):
- Nur jedem das Seine, BWV 163 (24 November 1715; probably also 31 October 1723)
- Wohl dem, der sich auf seinen Gott, BWV 139 (chorale cantata, 12 November 1724)
- Falsche Welt, dir trau ich nicht, BWV 52 (24 November 1726)

=== 24th Sunday after Trinity (Trinity XXIV) ===
Readings
Colossians 1:9–14, prayer for the Colossians
Matthew 9:18–26, the story of Jairus' daughter
Hymns
"Mitten wir im Leben sind"
"Herr Jesu Christ, wahr Mensch und Gott"
"Allein zu dir, Herr Jesu Christ"
"Ich weiß, daß mein Erlöser lebt"
Cantatas
Georg Philipp Telemann:
- Beglückte Zeit, die uns des Wortes Licht, TWV 1:118 (Harmonischer Gottes-Dienst, 1726)
Christoph Graupner:
- see List of cantatas by Christoph Graupner#GWV 1165
Johann Sebastian Bach (see also Church cantata (Bach) § Trinity XXIV):
- O Ewigkeit, du Donnerwort, BWV 60 (7 November 1723)
- Ach wie flüchtig, ach wie nichtig, BWV 26 (chorale cantata, 19 November 1724)

=== 25th Sunday after Trinity (Trinity XXV) ===
Readings
1 Thessalonians 4:13–18, the coming of the Lord
Matthew 24:25–28, the Tribulation
Hymns
"Vater unser im Himmelreich"
"Es wird schier der letzte Tag herkommen"
"Gott hat das Evangelium"
"Ach Gott thu dich erbarmen"
Cantatas
Georg Philipp Telemann:
- Ein zartes Kind hat nirgends größ're Lust, TWV 1:436 (Harmonischer Gottes-Dienst, 1726)
Christoph Graupner:
- see List of cantatas by Christoph Graupner#GWV 1166
Johann Sebastian Bach (see also Church cantata (Bach) § Trinity XXV):
- Es reißet euch ein schrecklich Ende, BWV 90 (14 November 1723)
- Du Friedefürst, Herr Jesu Christ, BWV 116 (chorale cantata, 26 November 1724)

=== 26th Sunday after Trinity (Trinity XXVI) ===
Readings
2 Peter 3:3–13, look for new heavens and a new earth
Matthew 25:31–46, the Second Coming of Christ
Hymns
"Es wird schier der letzte Tag herkommen"
"Es ist gewißlich an der Zeit"
"Gott der Vater wohn uns bei"
"Kommt her zu mir spricht Gottes Sohn"
Cantatas
Georg Philipp Telemann:
- Glaubet, hoffet, leidet, duldet, TWV 1:626 (Harmonischer Gottes-Dienst, 1726)
Christoph Graupner:
- see List of cantatas by Christoph Graupner#GWV 1167
Johann Sebastian Bach (see also Church cantata (Bach) § Trinity XXVI):
- Wachet! betet! betet! wachet! BWV 70 (21 November 1723)

=== 27th Sunday after Trinity (Trinity XXVII) ===
Readings
1 Thessalonians 5:1–11, be prepared for the day of the Lord
Matthew 25:1–13, parable of the Ten Virgins
Hymns
"Wachet auf, ruft uns die Stimme"
"Nun freut euch, lieben Christen g'mein"
"Ein feste Burg ist unser Gott"
"Wie schön leuchtet der Morgenstern"
Cantatas
Georg Philipp Telemann:
- Daß Herz und Sinn, o schwacher Mensch, TWV 1:194 (Harmonischer Gottes-Dienst, 1726)
Christoph Graupner:
- see List of cantatas by Christoph Graupner#GWV 1168
Johann Sebastian Bach (see also Church cantata (Bach) § Trinity XXVII):
- Wachet auf, ruft uns die Stimme, BWV 140 (chorale cantata, 25 November 1731)

== Other occasions ==
=== Consecration of church and/or organ ===
Readings
Revelation 21:2–8, the new Jerusalem
Luke 19:1–10, conversion of Zacchaeus
Cantatas
Georg Philipp Telemann:
- Heilig, heilig ist Gott, TWV 2:6 (1747)
- Zerschmettert die Götzen, TWV 2:7 (16 May 1751)
- Wie lieblich sind doch deine Wohnungen, TWV 2:13
Johann Sebastian Bach:
- Höchsterwünschtes Freudenfest, BWV 194 (2 November 1723: Störmthal version, BDW 00238)

=== New council ===
The election or inauguration of a new town council was celebrated with a service. Normally this was an annual event. The cantata written for such celebrations were indicated with the term "Ratswechsel" (changing of the council) or "Ratswahl" (election of the council).

Cantatas
Johann Michael Bach:
- Die Furcht des Herren, ABA II, 8 (BDW 08802)
Johann Sebastian Bach:
- In Mühlhausen the celebration was held on 4 February:
  - Gott ist mein König, BWV 71 (1708; Bach's first printed work)
  - second Ratswahl cantata for Mühlhausen, BWV Anh. 192 (1709; lost, BDW 01503)
- In Leipzig the service was held at the Nikolaikirche on the Monday following Bartholomew (Bartholomäus), 24 August:
  - Preise, Jerusalem, den Herrn, BWV 119 (30 August 1723)
  - Wünschet Jerusalem Glück, BWV Anh. 4 (27 August 1725; only Picander's text extant)
  - Ihr Tore zu Zion, BWV 193 (25 August 1727, incomplete)
  - Gott, gib dein Gerichte dem Könige, BWV Anh. 3 (28 August 1730, only Picander's text extant)
  - Wir danken dir, Gott, wir danken dir, BWV 29 (27 August 1731, reused 31 August 1739 and 25 August 1749)
  - Herrscher des Himmels, König der Ehren, BWV Anh. 193 (29 August 1740, only text extant)
  - Gott, man lobet dich in der Stille, BWV 120 (29 August 1742)
  - Lobe den Herrn, meine Seele, BWV 69 (26 August 1748)

=== 200th anniversary of the Augsburg Confession ===
25 June 1730 was 200 years after the Augsburg Confession. In Leipzig the occasion was remembered by a three-day festival. Picander wrote three cantata librettos (later published in Ernst-Schertzhaffte und Satyrische Gedichte, Vol. III, 1732), one for each day of the celebration. Johann Sebastian Bach set these librettos. The music of these settings is however largely lost:

1. Singet dem Herrn ein neues Lied, BWV 190a (25 June 1730, BDW 00231 – music lost but presumably borrowed from movements 1, 2, 3 and 5 of BWV 190)
2. Gott, man lobet dich in der Stille, BWV 120b (26 June 1730, BDW 00147 – music lost but partially reconstructable from BWV 120, 120a, 232^{II}/9 and 1019a)
3. Wünschet Jerusalem Glück, BWV Anh. 4a (27 June 1730, BDW 01312 – music lost, probably based on the —equally lost— cantata BWV Anh. 4)

=== Wedding ===
Music for weddings includes sacred cantatas for wedding ceremonies and secular cantatas for wedding celebrations. Telemann's music for weddings includes wedding anniversary cantatas. BWV 202, 210 and 216 are examples of secular cantatas for weddings by J. S. Bach.

Sacred cantatas for weddings
Johann Christoph Bach
- Meine Freundin, du bist schön, ABA II, 9 (BDW 08804)
Johann Sebastian Bach:
- Der Herr denket an uns, BWV 196 (5 June 1708?)
- Sein Segen fließt daher wie ein Strom, BWV Anh. 14 (12 February 1725, music lost)
- Auf, süß entzückende Gewalt, BWV Anh. 196 (27 November 1725, music lost)
- O ewiges Feuer, o Ursprung der Liebe, BWV 34a, (1726, incomplete)
- Dem Gerechten muß das Licht, BWV 195, (1727–31?, several versions)
- Der Herr ist freundlich dem, der auf ihn harret, BWV Anh. 211 (18 January 1729, music lost)
- Vergnügende Flammen, verdoppelt die Macht, BWV Anh. 212 (26 July 1729, music lost)
- Herr Gott, Beherrscher aller Dinge, BWV 120a (?1729, incomplete, based on various movements of other compositions)
- Gott ist unsre Zuversicht, BWV 197 (1736/37)

=== Anniversary ===
Christoph Graupner:

- see List of cantatas by Christoph Graupner#GWV 1174

Georg Christoph Bach:

- Birthday cantata Siehe, wie fein und lieblich ist, ABA II, 2 (6 September 1689, BDW 08789)

Gottfried Heinrich Stölzel wrote birthday cantatas for his employer, Frederick III, Duke of Saxe-Gotha-Altenburg:

- Deine Gnade müsse mein Trost sein, H. 391
- Verbirge dein Antlitz nicht für mir, H. 392 (1744)
- Laß meinen Mund deines Ruhmes, H. 393
- Laß meinen Gang gewiß sein, H. 394
- Deine Hand hat mich gemacht und bereitet, H. 395
- Nun merke ich daß der Herr seinen Gesalbten hilft, H. 396

=== Funeral ===
Georg Philipp Telemann wrote cantatas for funerals.

Christoph Graupner:

- see List of cantatas by Christoph Graupner#GWV 1175

In addition to funeral motets (e.g. BWV 118) and secular cantatas for memorial services (e.g. BWV 198) Johann Sebastian Bach wrote church cantatas for funerals:

- Gottes Zeit ist die allerbeste Zeit, BWV 106 (a.k.a. Actus tragicus, 16 September 1708?)
- Was ist, das wir Leben nennen (2 April 1716; music lost, BDW 01531)
- Ich lasse dich nicht, du segnest mich denn, BWV 157 (6 February 1727)
- Klagt, Kinder, klagt es aller Welt, BWV 244a (24 March 1729)
- Mein Gott, nimm die gerechte Seele, BWV Anh. 17 (music lost, BDW 01325)

Johann Sebastian Bach or Georg Melchior Hoffmann:

- Schlage doch, gewünschte Stunde, BWV 53 (BDW 00068)

=== Communion service ===
Georg Philipp Telemann wrote chorale cantatas intended for communion in a Abendmahlsgottesdienst.

== Occasion not specified ==
=== Chorale cantatas ===
Georg Philipp Telemann (in addition to chorale cantatas for specified occasions):

- Ein feste Burg ist unser Gott, TWV 1:419 and 1:420

Johann Sebastian Bach (in addition to chorale cantatas for specified occasions):

- Sei Lob und Ehr dem höchsten Gut, BWV 117 (c.1728–1731)
- Nun danket alle Gott, BWV 192 (Autumn 1730, incomplete but the extant parts seem to indicate a chorale cantata setup)
- Was Gott tut, das ist wohlgetan, BWV 100 (c.1732–1735)
- In allen meinen Taten, BWV 97 (possibly 25 July 1734, 5th Sunday after Trinity)

Felix Mendelssohn:

- Christe, du Lamm Gottes, MWV A5 (1827)
- Jesu, meine Freude, MWV A6 (1828)
- Wer nur den lieben Gott läβt walten, MWV A7 (1829)
- O Haupt voll Blut und Wunden, MWV A8 (1830)
- Vom Himmel hoch, MWV A10 (1831)
- Wir glauben all an einem Gott, MWV A12 (1831)
- Ach Gott, vom Himmel sieh darein, MWV A13 (1832)

=== In ogni tempore ===
"Et in ogni tempore" (literally "and at all times") was specified by Bach for his cantatas BWV 21 and 51. It may apply for other cantatas with an unknown designation.

=== Occasion not known or uncertain ===
Johann Michael Bach:

- Es ist ein großer Gewinn, ABA II, 3 (BDW 08792)
- Ach, wie sehnlich wart' ich der Zeit, ABA II, 4 (BDW 08794)
- Auf, lasst uns den Herren loben, ABA II, 5 (BDW 08796)
- Ach bleib bei uns, Herr Jesu Christ, ABA II, 7 (BDW 08800)

Johann Christoph Bach?:

- Ach, dass ich Wassers genug hätte, BNB I/B/9 (lamento, BDW 09088)

Johann Ludwig Bach:

- Es wird des Herren Tag kommen, JLB 25 (BDW 08202)

For several of Georg Philipp Telemann's church cantatas no occasion is indicated.

Also several of Johann Sebastian Bach's church cantatas have an unknown or uncertain designation:

- Nach dir, Herr, verlanget mich, BWV 150 (early cantata, c.1707, various possible occasions suggested, including Trinity III or a confession service – text partly based on Psalm 25)
- Aus der Tiefen rufe ich, Herr, zu dir, BWV 131 (early cantata, c.1707, occasion uncertain – text based on Psalm 130)
- Lobe den Herrn, meine Seele, BWV 143 (Weimar cantata)
- Bekennen will ich seinen Namen, BWV 200 (c.1742, arrangement of the aria "Dein Kreuz, o Bräutgam meiner Seele" from Gottfried Heinrich Stölzel's Passion Oratorio Ein Lämmlein geht und trägt die Schuld, for an otherwise lost cantata, possibly for Epiphany or Purification)
- Tilge, Höchster, meine Sünden, BWV 1083 (c.1746, arrangement of Pergolesi's Stabat Mater, with a German paraphrase of Psalm 51 as parody text – not known for which occasion it was performed in Leipzig)

== 19th century ==
=== Felix Mendelssohn ===
Felix Mendelssohn wrote several sacred cantatas, many of these at least in part a tribute to Johann Sebastian Bach.

== 20th century ==
=== Arthur Honegger ===
In 1953 Arthur Honegger composed Une cantate de Noël (A Christmas Cantata).

== Sources ==
- Vollständiges Kirchen-Buch: Darinnen Die Evangelia und Episteln auf alle Fest- Sonn- und Apostel-Tage durchs gantze Jahr (...) Leipzig: Lanckisch, 1743 (1748)
- Alfred Dürr: Johann Sebastian Bach: Die Kantaten. Bärenreiter, Kassel 1999, ISBN 3-7618-1476-3 (in German)
- Alfred Dürr: The Cantatas of J.S. Bach, Oxford University Press, 2006. ISBN 0-19-929776-2
- Glöckner, Andreas (2009). "Ein weiterer Kantatenjahrgang Gottfried Heinrich Stölzels in Bachs Aufführungsrepertoire?" [Is there another cantata cycle by Gottfried Heinrich Stölzel that belonged to Bach’s performance repertoire?]. In Wollny, Peter (ed.). Bach-Jahrbuch 2009 [Bach Yearbook 2009]. Bach-Jahrbuch (in German). Vol. 95. Neue Bachgesellschaft. Leipzig: Evangelische Verlagsanstalt. pp. 95–115. doi:10.13141/bjb.v2009. ISBN 978-3-374-02749-1. ISSN 0084-7682.
- Werner Neumann: Handbuch der Kantaten J.S.Bachs, 1947, 5th ed. 1984, ISBN 3-7651-0054-4
- Pfau, Marc-Roderich (2008). "Ein unbekanntes Leipziger Kantatentextheft aus dem Jahr 1735: Neues zum Thema Bach und Stölzel" [An unknown Leipzig cantata text publication from the year 1735: News regarding Bach and Stölzel]. In Wollny, Peter (ed.). Bach-Jahrbuch 2008 [Bach Yearbook 2008]. Bach-Jahrbuch (in German). Vol. 94. Neue Bachgesellschaft. Leipzig: Evangelische Verlagsanstalt. pp. 99–122. doi:10.13141/bjb.v2008. ISBN 978-3-374-02668-5. ISSN 0084-7682.
- Hans-Joachim Schulze: Die Bach-Kantaten: Einführungen zu sämtlichen Kantaten Johann Sebastian Bachs (in German)
- Christoph Wolff/Ton Koopman: Die Welt der Bach-Kantaten Verlag J.B. Metzler, Stuttgart, Weimar 2006 ISBN 978-3-476-02127-4 (in German)
