= Hegewald =

Hegewald may refer to:

- Hegewald (colony), a short-lived German colony in Reichskommissariat Ukraine
- Hegewald Film, a German film production company
- Liddy Hegewald (1884–1950), German film producer
- Tobias Hegewald (born 1989), German car racer

== See also ==
- Hegenwald
