= This Is the Day (disambiguation) =

"This Is the Day" is a 1983 song by The The.

This Is the Day may also refer to:

- This Is the Day (album), by Christy Moore, 2001
- This Is the Day, a 2010 album by Ezio
- "This Is the Day", an anthem by John Rutter commissioned for the Royal Wedding in 2011
- This Is the Day, a 2012 album by the Cambridge Singers with Aurora Orchestra
- "This Is the Day" (Ivy song), 1998
- "This Is the Day", a song by the Cranberries from the album Wake Up and Smell the Coffee, 2001
- "This Is the day", a song by Captain Beefheart on the album Unconditionally Guaranteed, 1974

== See also ==
- This is the day which the Lord hath made (disambiguation)
- This Is the Day...This Is the Hour...This Is This!, a 1989 album by Pop Will Eat Itself
