= Harmonischer Gottes-Dienst =

Harmonischer Gottes-Dienst is a year-cycle of 72 church cantatas composed and published by Georg Philipp Telemann in 1725–26.

Harmonischer Gottes-Dienst 1725–26
	Occasion	Cantata	TWV	1725–26	TMW	B C D E N S T
9	New Year	Halt ein mit deinem Wetterstrahle	1:715	I pp. 1–11	I No. 1	T Vol. 2/4
10	New Year I	Schmeckt und sehet unsers Gottes Freundlichkeit	1:1252	I pp. 11–26	I No. 2	T Vol. 6/3
11	Epiphany	Ihr Völker hört	1:921	I pp. 26–44	I No. 3	T Vol. 4/2
12	Epiphany I	In gering- und rauhen Schalen	1:941	I pp. 44–56	I No. 4	T Vol. 1/2
13	Epiphany II	Ist Widerwärtigkeit den Frommen eigen	1:948	I pp. 57–67	I No. 5	T Vol. 2/5
14	Epiphany III	Warum verstellst du die Gebärden?	1:1502	I pp. 67–80	I No. 6	T Vol. 6/4
15	Purification	Erscheine, Gott, in deinem Tempel	1:471	I pp. 81–93	I No. 7	T Vol. 4/3
16	Epiphany IV	Hemmet den Eifer, verbannet die Rache	1:730	I pp. 94–104	I No. 8	T Vol. 1/3
17	Epiphany V	Liebe, die vom Himmel stammet	1:1044	I pp. 104–114	I No. 9	T Vol. 2/6; E Alto C./7
18	Epiphany VI	Was ist das Herz?	1:1516	Anh. pp. 2–13	I No. 10	D Vol. 2/3
19	Septuagesima	Ein jeder läuft, der in den Schranken läuft	1:425	I pp. 114–126	I No. 11	T Vol. 6/5
20	Sexagesima	Was ist mir doch das Rühmen nütze?	1:1521	I pp. 127–139	I No. 12	T Vol. 4/4
21	Estomihi	Seele, lerne dich erkennen	1:1258	I pp. 140–152	I No. 13	T Vol. 1/4
22	Invocabit	Fleuch der Lüste Zauberauen	1:549	I pp. 152–165	I No. 14	
23	Reminiscere	Der Reichtum macht allein beglückt	1:313	I pp. 165–178	I No. 15	T Vol. 6/6
24	Oculi	Wandelt in der Liebe	1:1498	I pp. 179–189	II No. 16	T Vol. 4/5
25	Laetare	Du bist verflucht, o Schreckensstimme	1:385	I pp. 190–202	II No. 17	T Vol. 1/5
26	Judica	Wer ist, der dort von Edom kömmt	1:1584	I pp. 202–211	II No. 18	E Alto C./3
27	Annunciation	Gott will Mensch und sterblich werden	1:694	Anh. pp. 13–24	II No. 19	T Vol. 5/1
28	Palm Sunday	Schaut die Demut Palmen tragen	1:1245	I pp. 212–221	II No. 20	T Vol. 6/7; D Vol. 2/4
29	Easter	Weg mit Sodoms gift'gen Früchten	1:1534	I pp. 222–232	II No. 21	T Vol. 4/6
30	Easter 2	Triumphierender Versöhner	1:1422	Anh. pp. 25–37	II No. 22	B CD 2/1
31	Easter 3	Jauchzt, ihr Christen, seid vergnügt	1:955	Anh. pp. 37–48	II No. 23	T Vol. 5/2
32	Quasimodogeniti	Auf ehernen Mauern	1:96	I pp. 233–245	II No. 24	T Vol. 1/6
33	Misericordias Domini	Hirt' und Bischof uns'rer Seelen	1:804b	I pp. 246–257	II No. 25	E Alto C./6
34	Jubilate	Dies ist der Gotteskinder Last	1:356	I pp. 258–269	II No. 26	S 2/4
35	Cantate	Ew'ge Quelle, milder Strom	1:546	I pp. 269–282	II No. 27	T Vol. 7/1; C No. 11
36	Rogate	Deine Toten werden leben	1:213	I pp. 282–295	II No. 28	T Vol. 3/1
37	Ascension	Du fährest mit Jauchzen	1:387	Anh. pp. 48–59	II No. 29	
38	Exaudi	Erwachet, entreißt euch den sündlichen Träumen	1:480	I pp. 295–307	II No. 30	T Vol. 5/3
39	Pentecost	Zischet nur, stechet, ihr feurigen Zungen	1:1732	I pp. 307–320	II No. 31	C No. 12
40	Pentecost 2	Schmückt das frohe Fest mit Maien	1:1256	Anh. pp. 60–69	III No. 32	T Vol. 5/4
41	Pentecost 3	Ergeuß dich zur Salbung	1:447	Anh. pp. 69–81	III No. 33	E Alto C./6; C No. 14
42	Trinity	Unbegreiflich ist dein Wesen	1:1745	II pp. 2–11	III No. 34	B CD 1/1
43	Trinity I	Verlöschet, ihr Funken	1:1471	II pp. 12–25	III No. 35	N No. 4
44	Trinity II	Stille die Tränen des winselnden Armen	1:1401	II pp. 25–35	III No. 36	T Vol. 7/2
45	Trinity III	Wer sehnet sich nach Kerker	1:1594	II pp. 36–47	III No. 37	T Vol. 3/2
46	Trinity IV	Ihr seligen Stunden erquickender Freude	1:917	II pp. 48–60	III No. 38	
47	Trinity V	Begnadigte Seelen gesegneter Christen	1:119	II pp. 60–71	III No. 39	
48	Trinity VI	Ich bin getauft in Christi Tode	1:820	II pp. 72–83	III No. 40	T Vol. 7/3
49	Trinity VII	Wenn Israel am Nilusstrand	1:1562	II pp. 84–94	III No. 41	T Vol. 3/3
50	Trinity VIII	Weicht, ihr Sünden!	1:1538	II pp. 95–109	III No. 42	E Alto C./1
51	Trinity IX	Das Wetter rührt mit Strahl und Blitzen	1:199	II pp. 109–120	III No. 43	
52	Trinity X	Kein Vogel kann im weiten Fliegen	1:994	II pp. 120–130	III No. 44	T Vol. 7/4; C CD 3/1
53	Trinity XI	Durchsuche dich, o stolzer Geist	1:399	II pp. 130–141	III No. 45	T Vol. 3/4
54	Trinity XII	Ihr, deren Leben mit banger Finsternis	1:897	II pp. 141–151	III No. 46	
55	Trinity XIII	Deines neuen Bundes Gnade	1:212	II pp. 152–162	III No. 47	D Vol. 3/5 C CD 3/2
56	Trinity XIV	Schau nach Sodom nicht zurücke	1:1243	II pp. 162–172	III No. 48	C CD 3/3
57	Trinity XV	Trifft menschlich und voll Fehler sein	1:1417	II pp. 173–184	III No. 49	T Vol. 3/5
58	Trinity XVI	Die stärkende Wirkung des Geistes	1:363	II pp. 184–194	III No. 50	E Alto C./5
59	Trinity XVII	Umschlinget uns, ihr sanften Friedensbande	1:1426	II pp. 194–204	IV No. 51	
60	Trinity XVIII	Ich schaue bloß auf Gottes Güte	1:859	II pp. 205–214	IV No. 52	T Vol. 7/5; YT
61	Trinity XIX	Es ist ein schlechter Ruhm	1:506	II pp. 215–225	IV No. 53	T Vol. 3/6
62	Trinity XX	Die Ehre des herrlichen Schöpfers zu melden	1:334	II pp. 226–236	IV No. 54	C CD 3/4
63	Trinity XXI	Verfolgter Geist, wohin?	1:1467	II pp. 237–248	IV No. 55	C CD 3/5
64	Trinity XXII	Erhalte mich, o Herr, in deinem Werke!	1:449	II pp. 248–257	IV No. 56	T Vol. 7/6
65	Trinity XXIII	Locke nur, Erde, mit schmeichelndem Reize	1:1069	II pp. 257–266	IV No. 57	T Vol. 3/7
66	Trinity XXIV	Beglückte Zeit, die uns des Wortes Licht	1:118	Anh. pp. 117–126	IV No. 58	E Alto C./2
67	Trinity XXV	Ein zartes Kind hat nirgends größ're Lust	1:436	Anh. pp. 126–132	IV No. 59	
68	Trinity XXVI	Glaubet, hoffet, leidet, duldet	1:626	Anh. pp. 132–142	IV No. 60	B CD 1/6
69	Trinity XXVII	Daß Herz und Sinn, o schwacher Mensch	1:194	Anh. pp. 142–150	IV No. 61	Var. /2
70	St. John's Day	Die Kinder des Höchsten sind rufende Stimmen	1:349	Anh. pp. 81–91	IV No. 62	T Vol. 5/5
71	Visitation	Gottlob, die Frucht hat sich gezeiget	1:670	Anh. pp. 92–103	IV No. 63	
72	St. Michael's Day	Packe dich, gelähmter Drache	1:1222	Anh. pp. 103–117	IV No. 64	T Vol. 5/6
1	Advent I	Erwachet zum Kriegen	1:481	II pp. 267–275	IV No. 65	T Vol. 2/1
2	Advent II	Endlich wird die Stunde schlagen	1:440	II pp. 275–284	IV No. 66	T Vol. 6/1; D Vol. 3/3
3	Advent III	Vor des lichten Tages Schein	1:1483	II pp. 284–296	IV No. 67	T Vol. 4/1
4	Advent IV	Lauter Wonne, lauter Freude	1:1040	II pp. 296–306	IV No. 68	T Vol. 1/1
5	Christmas	Erquickendes Wunder der ewigen Gnade	1:469	II pp. 306–315	IV No. 69	T Vol. 2/2
6	Christmas 2	Jauchzet, frohlocket, der Himmel ist offen	1:953	Anh. pp. 151–159	IV No. 70	T Vol. 2/3
7	Christmas 3	Unverzagt in allem Leide	1:1456	Anh. pp. 159–166	IV No. 71	
8	Christmas I	Was gleicht dem Adel wahrer Christen	1:1511	II pp. 316–326	IV No. 72	T Vol. 6/2

== Sources ==
- Google cache from a Swedish page
- The whole collection from The royal library of Denmark
