= Dies sind die heilgen zehn Gebot =

Lutheran hymn

- Hymn by Martin Luther
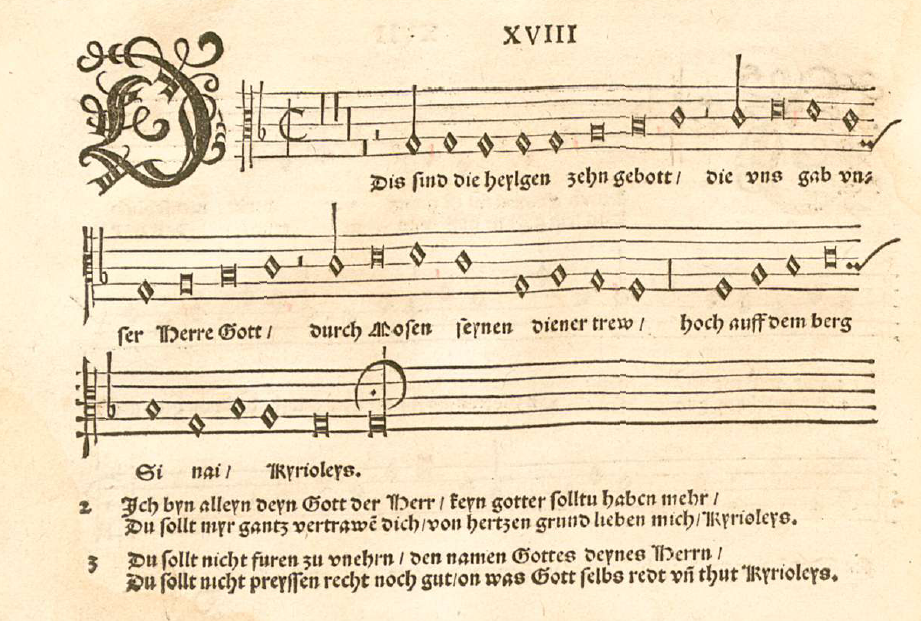
- The hymn in Eyn geystlich Gesangk Buchleyn, 1524
- English: These are the holy Ten Commandments
- Catalogue: Zahn 1951
- Text: by Martin Luther
- Language: German
- Published: 1524

"Dies sind die heilgen zehn Gebot" (These are the holy Ten Commandments) is a hymn by the Protestant reformer Martin Luther based on the Ten Commandments. It appeared first in 1524 in the Erfurt Enchiridion.

== History ==
The reformer Martin Luther wrote the hymn in twelve stanzas of four lines each as a catechetical setting of the Ten Commandments. The commandments were used for confession and for instructions. After an introduction, stanzas 2 to 10 are related to the ten commandments; 11 and 12 provide a conclusion, related to Jesus. In 1524, Luther published the hymn in the Erfurt Enchiridion with a hymn tune, Zahn No. 1951, based on an older melody ("In Gottes Namen Fahren wir"). The hymn is a "Leise", concluding each stanza by "Kyrieleis".

The hymn also appeared in Johann Walter's choral hymnal Eyn geystlich Gesangk Buchleyn in 1524. It appeared in 1854 in Schircks's edition of Luther‘s hymns (Geistliche Lieder), and in the hymnal Unverfälschter Liedersegen in 1851. In the current Protestant German hymnal, the Evangelisches Gesangbuch, it is EG 231.

An early English translation was titled "That men a godly life might live". It was published in Richard Massie's M. Luther's Spiritual Songs in 1854, and in the Ohio Lutheran Hymnal in 1880. Another English translation, used in various Lutheran hymnals since the 1950s, is titled "These Are the Holy Ten Commands."

== Melody and settings ==
The melody was assigned as for "In Gottes Namen fahren wir", but other melodies were also used, such as "Wär Gott nicht mit uns diese Zeit".

Johann Michael Bach composed a chorale prelude, Jan Pieterszoon Sweelinck wrote two variations for the organ, and Johann Hermann Schein composed a setting for two soprano voices and continuo. Johann Sebastian Bach wrote a four-part setting, BWV 298; he used the chorale in the opening movement of cantata Du sollt Gott, deinen Herren, lieben, BWV 77. The chorale juxtaposes the topic of the cantata, the commandment of love. In his Clavier-Übung III, he dedicated two pieces to the chorale, a chorale prelude with five voices and a fughetta for a single manual, BWV 678-679. Bach also wrote the first of the catechism chorale preludes, BWV 635, for the Orgelbüchlein.

== Sources ==
Books

- Chafe, Eric (2003). Analyzing Bach Cantatas. Oxford University Press. pp. 161–173. ISBN 9780199882977.
- Hahn, Gerhard (2015). EG 231. Dies sind die heilgen zehn Gebot (in German) (20 ed.). Vandenhoeck & Ruprecht. pp. 18–20. ISBN 9783647503431.
- Jones, Richard D. P. (2013). The Creative Development of Johann Sebastian Bach, Volume II: 1717–1750: Music to Delight the Spirit. Oxford University Press. p. 126. ISBN 978-0-19-969628-4.
- Stip, G.Ch. H. Unverfälschter Liedersegen. Рипол Классик. p. 61. ISBN 9785883760111.
- Williams, Peter (2003), The Organ Music of J. S. Bach (2nd ed.), Cambridge University Press, pp. 300–302, ISBN 0-521-89115-9
- Zahn, Johannes (1889). Die Melodien der deutschen evangelischen Kirchenlieder (in German). Gütersloh: Bertelsmann. p. 524. volume I

Online sources

- "14. Dies sind die heilgen Zehn Gebot" (PDF) (in German). Luther Gesellschaft. 2017.
- "Dies sind die heil'gen zehn Gebot". hymnary.org.
- "These Are the Holy Ten Commands". hymnary.org.
