= Singet dem Herrn ein neues Lied, TWV 1:1342–1345 =

Set of church cantatas by Georg Philipp Telemann

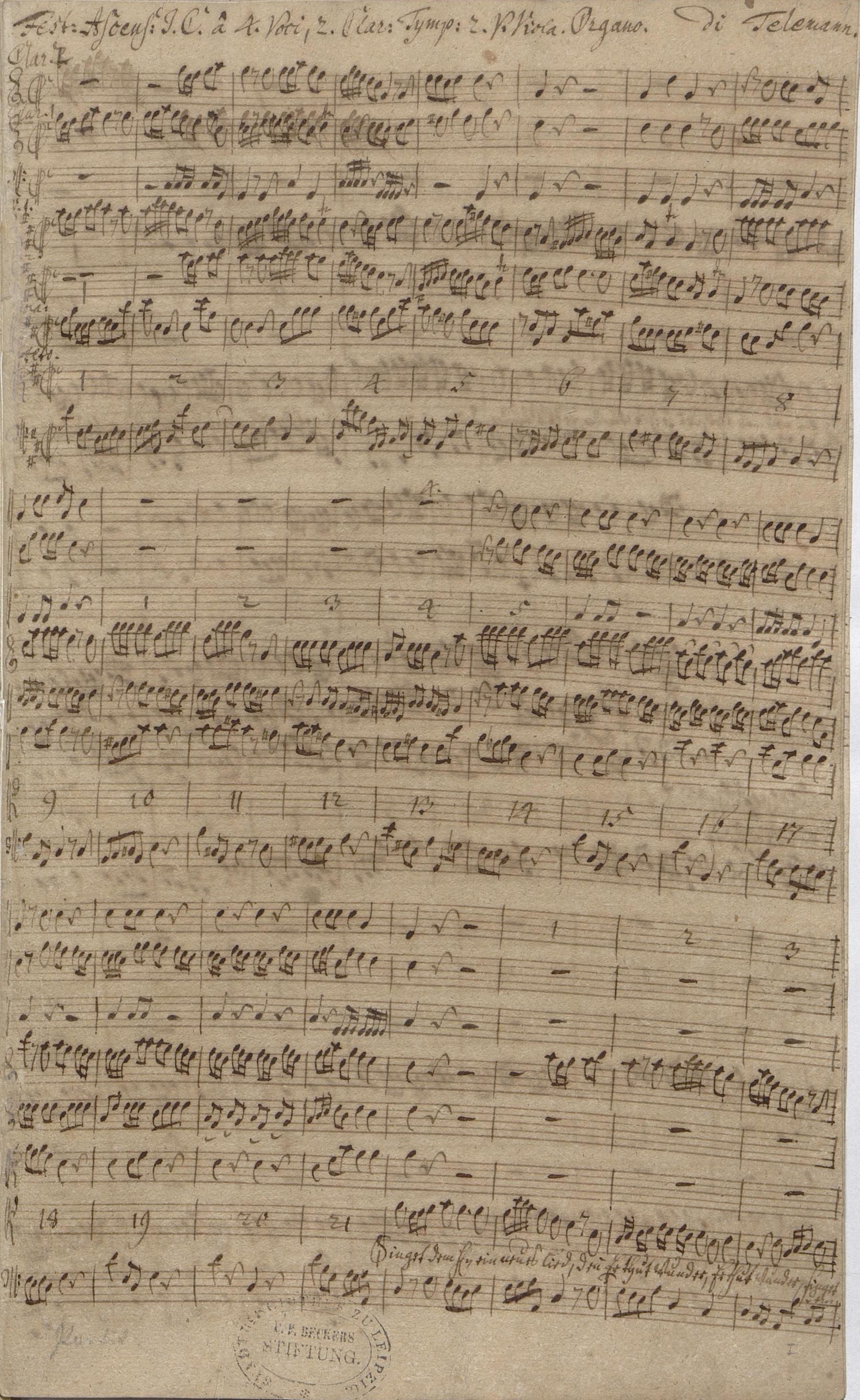
Telemann's Singet dem Herrn ein neues Lied, TWV 1:1343: first page of Christian Gotthilf Sensenschmidt's mid 18th century copy of the score.

There are four church cantatas by Georg Philipp Telemann sharing the title Singet dem Herrn ein neues Lied:

- TWV 1:1342, for Trinity XXIII
- TWV 1:1343, for Ascension
- TWV 1:1344, for Easter
- TWV 1:1345, a setting of Psalm 98, for St. John's Day

Another cantata with the same name, TWV 1:1748, was erroneously attributed to Telemann: it was composed by Melchior Hoffmann. Singet dem Herrn ein neues Lied, TWV 7:30 is Telemann's setting of Psalm 96.

== TWV 1:1342, for Trinity XXIII ==
Singet dem Herrn ein neues Lied, TWV 1:1342, is a church cantata for the 23rd Sunday after Trinity by Georg Philipp Telemann. It was written in Hamburg in 1724. Its music is lost: only the text, by an anonymous poet, survives.

== TWV 1:1343, for Ascension ==
Singet dem Herrn ein neues Lied, TWV 1:1343, is a church cantata for Ascension by Georg Philipp Telemann. It was composed on a text by Johann Friedrich Helbig, and belongs to Telemann's year-cycle without recitative (German: Jahrgang ohne Rezitativ). It was performed in Hamburg in 1725. The cantata has these movements:

1. "Singet dem Herrn ein neues Lied" (aria for alto)
2. "Christus hat den Lauf vollendet" (da capo aria for tenor)
3. "Christ fuhr gen Himmel" (chorale)
4. "Seid ihr nun mit Christo auferstanden" (aria for bass)
5. "Soll euch Christi Himmelfahrt" (aria for soprano)
6. "Zeuch Jesu uns zeuch uns nach dir" (chorale)

The cantata is in D major. Around the middle of the 18th century, Christian Gotthilf Sensenschmidt made a copy of the cantata, consisting of a score and performance parts. In that copy, the cantata is scored for SATB soloists and chorus, strings (two violin parts, one viola part and one cello part), two clarinos, timpani and continuo (figured part for organ, bassoon, and the cello part). A version of the cantata with a somewhat different scoring (including two additional oboes) was performed in 1725 in Frankfurt am Main. Sensenschmidt's copy of the cantata came in the possession of Carl Ferdinand Becker, and was later added to the collection of the Leipzig City Library. A digital facsimile of the Becker manuscript was made available on the SLUB Dresden website.

== TWV 1:1344, for Easter ==
Singet dem Herrn ein neues Lied, TWV 1:1344, is a church cantata for Easter by Georg Philipp Telemann. It was composed on a text by "Petiscus" (i.e. Martin Friedrich Pitiscus, 1722-1794), and performed in Hamburg in 1761. The cantata, in D major, is scored for SATB soloists and chorus, strings (two violin parts, and parts for viola and cello), two flutes, two oboes, two trumpets, timpani and organ (continuo).

== TWV 1:1345, for St. John's Day ==
Singet dem Herrn ein neues Lied, TWV 1:1345, is a church cantata for St. John's Day (24 June) by Georg Philipp Telemann. Its text is a German version of Psalm 98. Its oldest extant manuscript copies are dated to around 1723. Its movements are:

1. Sonata (instrumental introduction) and Chorus "Singet dem Herrn ein neues Lied" (12/8)
2. "Der Herr lässet sein Heil verkündigen" (3/4; concertato violin, tenor and continuo)
3. "Er gedenket an seine Güte" (soprano and continuo)
4. "Jauchzet dem Herren, alle Welt" (common time; horn, bass and continuo)
5. "Lobet den Herrn mit Harfen" (common time; harp, alto and continuo)
6. Chorus (common time):
  - "Mit Trommeten und Posaunen" (soprano, SATB, horns, trombones and continuo)
  - "Das Meer Brause" (SATB, horns, violins and continuo)
  - Adagio: "Denn er kömmt, das Erdreich zu richten" (same performers)
  - Allegro: "Alleluja" (same performers)

The cantata is in B-flat major, and is scored for SATB soloists and chorus, first and second violins, two horns, harp (replacing first violins in the 5th movement), two trombones (replacing violins in the first section of the final chorus) and continuo (violone and figured organ part). Carus published the cantata in 2016, edited by Klaus Hofmann, with a singable English translation (Sing to the Lord a new song) by Earl Rosenbaum. Digital facsimiles of the 18th-century manuscripts of the cantata are available at the SLUB Dresden and IMSLP websites.

== Sources ==
- Pleß, Heike (2001). "Der Kopist "C. G. S." und seine Abschriften von Kirchenkantaten Georg Philipp Telemanns und Gottfried Heinrich Stölzels". In Seidel, Wilhelm [in German]; Herrmann, Susanne; Lautenschläger, Juliane (eds.). Jahrbuch 2000 (in German). Vol. 2. Ständige Konferenz Mitteldeutsche Barockmusik. Eisenach: Karl Dieter Wagner. pp. 158–181. doi:10.13141/jmb.v2001. ISBN 3-88979-092-5 – via Qucosa.
