= Erhard Hegenwald =

Reformation writer

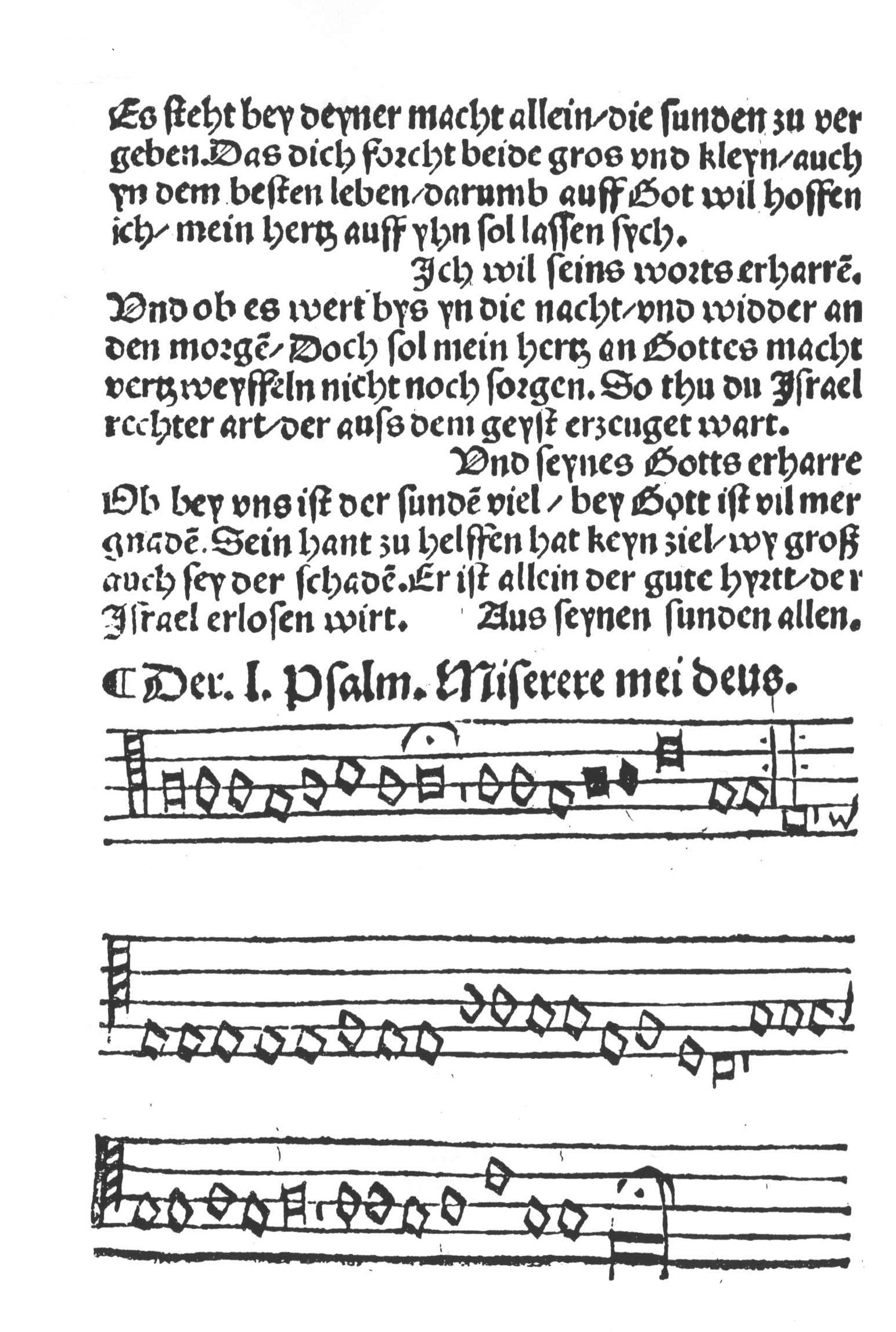
Print of his hymn in the Erfurt Enchiridion, 1524

Erhard Hegenwald (also Erhart Hegen Walt, first half of the 16th century) was a writer of the Reformation.

Hegenwald had been schoolmaster in Pfäfers Abbey and participated in the "First Zurich Disputation" of Ulrich Zwingli. He wrote a documentation of the dispute, titled "Handlung der Versammlung in der loblichen stat Zürich auff den 24. tag Jeners 1523, von wegen d. h. Evangelii" (Acto of the assembly in the praised city Zurich on 24 January 1523, on the Holy Gospel). This was printed in the same several times.

On Friday after Epiphany 1524, Hegewald's hymn "Erbarm dich mein, o Herre Gott, nach deiner großen Barmherzigkeit" (Have pity on me, O Lord God, according to thy great mercy) appeared in Wittenberg as a broadside. It is a paraphrase of Psalm 51 "Miserere". The song was included in the Erfurt Enchiridion and in other hymnals.

From Wittenberg, Hegenwald remained in contact with reformist circles in Zurich, said in a letter to Conrad Grebel from 1 January 1525.

In 1526, Hegewald received his doctorate in medicine in Wittenberg. It is not clear if he is the person of the same name who worked as a physician in Frankfurt from 1528 to 1540.

== Literature ==
- Carl Bertheau (1880). "Hegenwald, Erhard" . Allgemeine Deutsche Biographie (in German). Vol. 11. Leipzig: Duncker & Humblot. p. 275.
