= Haec dies quam fecit Dominus =

Haec dies quam fecit Dominus, or This is the day which the Lord hath made, may refer to:

== Haec dies ==
- verse 24 of Psalm 118, from which comes a gradual associated with Easter
- three compositions by Giovanni Pierluigi da Palestrina
- two compositions by Jan Dismas Zelenka
- a composition perhaps by Nicolas Bernier
- a composition by Otto Albert Tichý
- a composition by Johann David Heinichen
- a composition by John Ensdale in the Gyffard partbooks
- a composition by Marc-Antoine Charpentier
- a composition by William Byrd
- a track on the 1976 Gregorian chant album Paschale Mysterium
- part of Credo by Penderecki

== This is the day that the Lord hath made ==
- "This is the day that the Lord hath made", a song by John W. Peterson
- This is the day which the Lord hath made (Handel) or Wedding anthem for Princess Anne

== See also ==
- Mark Barkworth, Catholic priest and martyr (c. 1572 – 1601), sang Haec dies on the way to his execution
- Charles-Marie Widor's Symphonie Romane has Haec dies woven throughout all four movements
