= List of Bach cantatas =

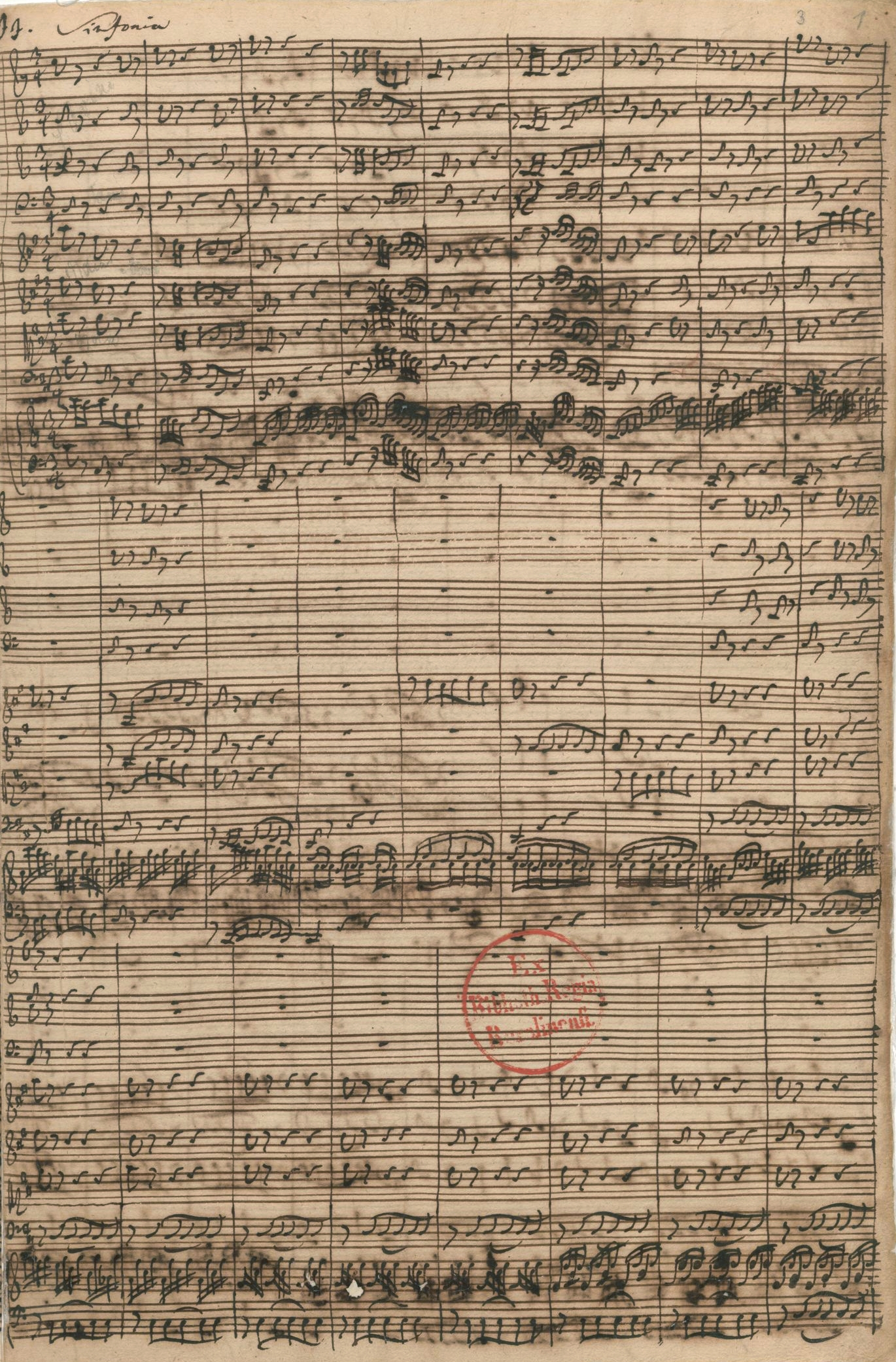
First page of the autograph of cantata Wir danken dir, Gott, wir danken dir, BWV 29

This is a sortable list of Bach cantatas, the cantatas composed by Johann Sebastian Bach. His almost 200 extant cantatas are among his important vocal compositions. Many are known to be lost. Bach composed both church cantatas, most of them for specific occasions of the liturgical year of the Lutheran Church, and secular cantatas.

Bach's earliest cantatas were written possibly from 1707, the year he moved to Mühlhausen, although he may have begun composing them at his previous post in Arnstadt. He began regular composition of church cantatas in Weimar between 1708 and 1717, writing one cantata per month. In his next position in Köthen, he composed no church cantatas, but secular cantatas for the court. Most of Bach's church cantatas date from his first years as Thomaskantor and director of church music in Leipzig, a position which he took up in 1723. Working for Leipzig's Thomaskirche and Nikolaikirche, it was part of Bach's job to perform a church cantata every Sunday and holiday, conducting soloists, the Thomanerchor and orchestra as part of the church service. In his first year there, starting after Trinity, Bach regularly composed a new cantata every week in his first cantata cycle. The following year, he followed the format, now basing each cantata on a Lutheran hymn in the chorale cantata cycle. He was less rigid over the following years, but still produced new compositions in his third to fifth years, the Picander cycle of 1728–29, and late works known up to 1745.

Bach also composed cantatas for other church services such as weddings and Ratswahl (the inauguration of a new town council), and he wrote secular cantatas, around 50 known works, for occasions such as academic functions of the University of Leipzig, and anniversaries and entertainment among the nobility and in society.

The list includes both extant cantatas and, as far as known, lost cantatas. It is sortable by the cantata number which equals the number in the Bach-Werke-Verzeichnis (BWV), by title, by occasion during the liturgical year, the year of composition and date of first performance, as far as known. The scoring is provided, grouped by singers and groups of instruments. Colouring shows which cantatas are not extant church cantatas and which works were not even composed by Bach, but attributed to him in the past. A link to the free score of the Bach Gesellschaft in the International Music Score Library Project (IMSLP) is provided if available.

== Abbreviations ==
The abbreviations of performers are given for solo singers, choir (typically SATB), brass instruments (plus timpani), woodwinds, strings, keyboard and basso continuo. The basso continuo consists of a group of players, depending upon the scoring of the cantata and the performance location. For example, a bassoon is typically playing when other wind instruments are called for, an organ may be played in church, a harpsichord will be used in secular surroundings.

Solo	Choir	Brass and Percussion	Woodwinds	Strings	Keyboard and basso continuo
S = soprano	S = soprano	Tr = tromba (trumpet)	Fl = flauto (recorder)	Vl = violino (violin)	Org = organo (organ)
A = alto	A = alto	Tt = tromba da tirarsi	Fp = flauto piccolo	Vs = violino solo	Cemb = cembalo (harpsichord)
T = tenor	T = tenor	Cl = clarino (high Baroque trumpet)	Ft = flauto traverso	Va = viola	Lt = liuto (lute)
B = bass	B = bass	Tb = trombone	Ob = oboe	Vc = violoncello	Bc = basso continuo
		Co = corno (horn)	Oa = oboe d'amore	Vp = violoncello piccolo	
		Cc = corno da caccia	Ot = taille (tenor oboe)	Vm = viola d'amore	
		Ct = corno da tirarsi	Oc = oboe da caccia	Vg = viola da gamba	
		Li = lituo (lituus)	Fg = fagotto (bassoon)	Vt = violetta	
		Cn = cornetto		Vn = violone	
		Ti = timpani			

== List of cantatas ==
Colours
Sacred cantata
Secular cantata
Not a cantata
Not by Bach
Fragment
Not extant

The list follows the Bach-Werke-Verzeichnis and contains all sacred cantatas (1–197, 199), secular cantatas (198, 201–215), fragments (50, 80b, 216, 224) and works formerly attributed to Bach (15, 53, 141–142, 160, 189, 217–223), lost cantatas (36a, 66a, 70a, 80a, 120b and others), as well as works which are no longer considered cantatas (11, 53, 118). Most of the church cantatas are composed for occasions of the Lutheran liturgical year and related to prescribed readings. The Sundays after Trinity are numbered using roman numerals (for example "Trinity II" for the second Sunday after Trinity). The high holidays Christmas, Easter and Pentecost were celebrated for three days, indicated by numbers for the second and third day, for example "Easter 3" for the third day of Easter. Keyboard instruments are only listed for specific solo parts, not as part of the continuo group. If more than one part was composed for one instrument, the number is given, for example "3Tr" for three trumpets.

BWV	Title	Occasion	Origination		Instruments					Music			Notes	IMSLP
BWV	Title	Occasion	Year	Premiere	Solo	Choir	Brass	Wood	Strings	Key	Bc	Tonality	Notes	IMSLP
1	Wie schön leuchtet der Morgenstern, BWV 1	Annunciation	1725	25 Mar 1725	STB	SATB	2Co	2Oc	2Vs 2Vl Va		Bc	F major		♫
2	Ach Gott, vom Himmel sieh darein, BWV 2	Trinity II	1724	18 Jun 1724	ATB	SATB	4Tb	2Ob	2Vl Va		Bc	G minor		♫
3	Ach Gott, wie manches Herzeleid, BWV 3	Epiphany II	1725	14 Jan 1725	SATB	SATB	Co Tb	2Oa	2Vl Va		Bc	A major		♫
4	Christ lag in Todes Banden, BWV 4	Easter	1707?		SATB	SATB	Cn 3Tb		2Vl 2Va		Bc	E minor		♫
5	Wo soll ich fliehen hin, BWV 5	Trinity XIX	1724	15 Oct 1724	SATB	SATB	Tt	2Ob	2Vl Va		Bc	G minor		♫
6	Bleib bei uns, denn es will Abend werden, BWV 6	Easter 2	1725	2 Apr 1725	SATB	SATB	Tt	2Ob Oc	2Vl Va Vp		Bc	C minor		♫
7	Christ unser Herr zum Jordan kam, BWV 7	St. John's Day	1724	24 Jun 1724	ATB	SATB		2Oa	2Vs 2Vl Va		Bc	E minor		♫
8	Liebster Gott, wenn werd ich sterben? BWV 8	Trinity XVI	1724	24 Sep 1724	SATB	SATB	Co	Ft 2Oa	2Vl Va		Bc	E major / D major		♫
9	Es ist das Heil uns kommen her, BWV 9	Trinity VI	1732?		SATB	SATB		Ft Oa	2Vl Va		Bc	E major		♫
10	Meine Seel erhebt den Herren, BWV 10	Visitation	1724	2 Jul 1724	SATB	SATB	Tr	2Ob	2Vl Va		Bc	G minor		♫
11	Lobet Gott in seinen Reichen, BWV 11	Ascension	1738	15 May 1738	SATB	SATB	3Tr Ti	2Ft 2Ob	2Vl Va		Bc	D major	Ascension oratorio	♫
12	Weinen, Klagen, Sorgen, Zagen, BWV 12	Jubilate	1714	22 Apr 1714	ATB	SATB	Tr	Ob Fg	2Vl 2Va		Bc	F minor / G minor		♫
13	Meine Seufzer, meine Tränen, BWV 13	Epiphany II	1726	20 Jan 1726	SATB	SATB		2Fl Oc	2Vl Va		Bc	D minor		♫
14	Wär Gott nicht mit uns diese Zeit, BWV 14	Epiphany IV	1735	30 Jan 1735	STB	SATB	Cc	2Ob	2Vl Va		Bc	G minor		♫
15	Denn du wirst meine Seele nicht in der Hölle lassen, BWV 15				SATB	SATB	2Cl Tr Ti		2Vl Va		Bc	C major	Johann Ludwig Bach?	♫
16	Herr Gott, dich loben wir, BWV 16	New Year	1726	1 Jan 1726	ATB	SATB	Cc	2Ob Oc	2Vl Va (Vt)		Bc	A minor		♫
17	Wer Dank opfert, der preiset mich, BWV 17	Trinity XIV	1726	22 Sep 1726	SATB	SATB		2Ob	2Vl Va		Bc	A major		♫
18	Gleichwie der Regen und Schnee vom Himmel fällt, BWV 18	Sexagesimae	1713?		STB	SATB		2Fl Fg	4Va Vc		Bc	G minor / A minor		♫
19	Es erhub sich ein Streit, BWV 19	St. Michael's Day	1726	29 Sep 1726	STB	SATB	3Tr Ti	2Ob 2Oa Ot	2Vl Va		Bc	C major		♫
20	O Ewigkeit, du Donnerwort, BWV 20	Trinity I	1724	11 Jun 1724	ATB	SATB	Tt	3Ob	2Vl Va		Bc	F major		♫
21	Ich hatte viel Bekümmernis, BWV 21	Trinity III	1714	17 Jun 1714	STB	SATB	3Tr Ti 4Tb	Ob Fg	2Vl Va		Bc	C minor / D minor		♫
22	Jesus nahm zu sich die Zwölfe, BWV 22	Estomihi	1723	7 Feb 1723	ATB	SATB		Ob	2Vl Va		Bc	G minor		♫
23	Du wahrer Gott und Davids Sohn, BWV 23	Estomihi	1723	7 Feb 1723	SAT	SATB	Cn 3Tb	2Ob	2Vl Va		Bc	C minor / B minor		♫
24	Ein ungefärbt Gemüte, BWV 24	Trinity IV	1723	20 Jun 1723	ATB	SATB	Cl	2Ob 2Oa	2Vl Va		Bc	F major		♫
25	Es ist nichts Gesundes an meinem Leibe, BWV 25	Trinity XIV	1723	29 Aug 1723	STB	SATB	Cn 3Tb	3Fl 2Ob	2Vl Va		Bc	E minor		♫
26	Ach wie flüchtig, ach wie nichtig, BWV 26	Trinity XXIV	1724	19 Nov 1724	SATB	SATB	Co	Ft 3Ob	2Vl Va		Bc	A minor		♫
27	Wer weiß, wie nahe mir mein Ende? BWV 27	Trinity XVI	1726	6 Oct 1726	SATB	SSATB	Co	2Ob Oc	2Vl Va	Org	Bc	C minor		♫
28	Gottlob! nun geht das Jahr zu Ende, BWV 28	Christmas I	1725	30 Dec 1725	SATB	SATB	Cn 3Tb	2Ob Ot	2Vl Va		Bc	A minor		♫
29	Wir danken dir, Gott, wir danken dir, BWV 29	Town Council	1731	27 Aug 1731	SATB	SATB	3Tr Ti	2Ob	2Vl Va	Org	Bc	D major		♫
30	Freue dich, erlöste Schar, BWV 30	St. John's Day	1738	24 Jun 1738	SATB	SATB	3Tr Ti	2Ft 2Ob Oa	Vs 2Vl Va		Bc	D major		♫
30a	Angenehmes Wiederau, BWV 30a	Homage	1737	28 Sep 1737	SATB	SATB	3Tr Ti	2Ft 2Ob Oa	Vs 2Vl Va		Bc	D major	secular	♫
31	Der Himmel lacht! Die Erde jubilieret, BWV 31	Easter	1715	21 Apr 1715	STB	SSATB	3Tr Ti	3Ob Ot Fg	2Vl 2Va 2Vc		Bc	C major		♫
32	Liebster Jesu, mein Verlangen, BWV 32	Epiphany I	1726	13 Jan 1726	SB	SATB		Ob	2Vl Va		Bc	E minor		♫
33	Allein zu dir, Herr Jesu Christ, BWV 33	Trinity XIII	1724	3 Sep 1724	ATB	SATB		2Ob	2Vl Va		Bc	A minor		♫
34	O ewiges Feuer, o Ursprung der Liebe, BWV 34	Pentecost	1726	1 Jun 1727	ATB	SATB	3Tr Ti	2Ft 2Ob	2Vl Va		Bc	D major		♫
34a	O ewiges Feuer, o Ursprung der Liebe, BWV 34a	Wedding (church)	1726	8 Sep 1726	SATB	SATB	3Tr Ti	2Ft 2Ob	2Vl Va		Bc	D major	incomplete	
35	Geist und Seele wird verwirret, BWV 35	Trinity XII	1726	8 Sep 1726	A			2Ob Ot	2Vl Va	Org	Bc	D minor		♫
36	Schwingt freudig euch empor, BWV 36	Advent I	1731	2 Dec 1731	SATB	SATB		2Oa	2Vl Va		Bc	D major		♫
36a	Steigt freudig in die Luft, BWV 36a	Birthday	1726	30 Nov 1726									secular; music lost	
36b	Die Freude reget sich, BWV 36b	Birthday	1735		SATB	SATB		Fl	2Vl Va Vm		Bc	D major	secular	♫
36c	Schwingt freudig euch empor, BWV 36c	Birthday	1725		SATB	SATB		Oa	2Vl Va		Bc	D major	secular	♫
37	Wer da gläubet und getauft wird, BWV 37	Ascension	1724	18 May 1724	SATB	SATB		2Oa	2Vl Va		Bc	A major		♫
38	Aus tiefer Not schrei ich zu dir, BWV 38	Trinity XXI	1724	29 Oct 1724	SATB	SATB	4Tb	2Ob	2Vl Va		Bc	E minor		♫
39	Brich dem Hungrigen dein Brot, BWV 39	Trinity I	1726	23 Jun 1726	SAB	SATB		2Fl 2Ob	2Vl Va		Bc	G minor		♫
40	Darzu ist erschienen der Sohn Gottes, BWV 40	Christmas 2	1723	26 Dec 1723	ATB	SATB	2Co	2Ob	2Vl Va		Bc	F major		♫
41	Jesu, nun sei gepreiset, BWV 41	New Year	1725	1 Jan 1725	SATB	SATB	3Tr Ti	3Ob	2Vl Va Vp		Bc	C major		♫
42	Am Abend aber desselbigen Sabbats, BWV 42	Quasimodogeniti	1725	8 Apr 1725	SATB	SATB		2Ob Fg	2Vl Va Vc		Bc	D major		♫
43	Gott fähret auf mit Jauchzen, BWV 43	Ascension	1726	30 May 1726	SATB	SATB	3Tr Ti	2Ob	2Vl Va		Bc	C major		♫
44	Sie werden euch in den Bann tun, BWV 44	Exaudi	1724	21 May 1724	SATB	SATB		2Ob	2Vl Va		Bc	G minor		♫
45	Es ist dir gesagt, Mensch, was gut ist, BWV 45	Trinity VIII	1726	11 Aug 1726	ATB	SATB		2Ft 2Ob	2Vl Va		Bc	E major		♫
46	Schauet doch und sehet, ob irgend ein Schmerz sei, BWV 46	Trinity X	1723	1 Aug 1723	ATB	SATB	Tr	2Fl 2Oc	2Vl Va		Bc	D minor		♫
47	Wer sich selbst erhöhet, der soll erniedriget werden, BWV 47	Trinity XVII	1726	13 Oct 1726	SB	SATB		2Ob	2Vl Va	Org	Bc	G minor		♫
48	Ich elender Mensch, wer wird mich erlösen, BWV 48	Trinity XIX	1723	3 Oct 1723	AT	SATB	Tr	2Ob	2Vl Va		Bc	G minor		♫
49	Ich geh und suche mit Verlangen, BWV 49	Trinity XX	1726	3 Nov 1726	SB			Oa	2Vl Va Vp	Org	Bc	E major		♫
50	Nun ist das Heil und die Kraft, BWV 50	St. Michael's Day	1740?			SATBSATB	3Tr Ti	3Ob	2Vl Va		Bc	D major	fragment	♫
51	Jauchzet Gott in allen Landen, BWV 51	Trinity XV	1730	17 Sep 1730	S		Tr		2Vl Va		Bc	C major		♫
52	Falsche Welt, dir trau ich nicht, BWV 52	Trinity XXIII	1726	24 Nov 1726	SATB	SATB	2Co	3Ob Fg	2Vl Va		Bc	F major		♫
53	Schlage doch, gewünschte Stunde, BWV 53				A				2Vl Va		Bc	E major	G. M. Hoffmann? (an aria)	♫
54	Widerstehe doch der Sünde, BWV 54	Trinity VII	1713?	15 Jul 1714?	A				2Vl 2Va		Bc	E♭ major		♫
55	Ich armer Mensch, ich Sündenknecht, BWV 55	Trinity XXII	1726	17 Nov 1726	T	SATB		Ft Oa	2Vl Va		Bc	G minor		♫
56	Ich will den Kreuzstab gerne tragen, BWV 56	Trinity XIX	1726	27 Oct 1726	B	SATB		2Ob Ot	2Vl Va Vc		Bc	G minor		♫
57	Selig ist der Mann, BWV 57	Christmas 2	1725	26 Dec 1725	SB	SATB		2Ob Ot	2Vl Va		Bc	G minor		♫
58	Ach Gott, wie manches Herzeleid, BWV 58	New Year I	1727	5 Jan 1727	SB			2Ob Ot	2Vl Va		Bc	C major		♫
59	Wer mich liebet, der wird mein Wort halten, BWV 59	Pentecost	1724	28 May 1724	SB	SATB	2Tr Ti		2Vl Va		Bc	C major		♫
60	O Ewigkeit, du Donnerwort, BWV 60	Trinity XXIV	1723	7 Nov 1723	ATB	SATB	Co	2Oa	2Vl Va		Bc	D major		♫
61	Nun komm, der Heiden Heiland, BWV 61	Advent I	1714	2 Dec 1714	STB	SATB		Fg	2Vl 2Va		Bc	A minor		♫
62	Nun komm, der Heiden Heiland, BWV 62	Advent I	1724	3 Dec 1724	SATB	SATB	Co	2Ob	2Vl Va		Bc	B minor		♫
63	Christen, ätzet diesen Tag, BWV 63	Christmas	1713?		SATB	SATB	4Tr Ti	3Ob Fg	2Vl Va		Bc	C major		♫
64	Sehet, welch eine Liebe hat uns der Vater erzeiget, BWV 64	Christmas 3	1723	27 Dec 1723	SAB	SATB	Cn 3Tb	Oa	2Vl Va		Bc	E minor		♫
65	Sie werden aus Saba alle kommen, BWV 65	Epiphany	1724	6 Jan 1724	TB	SATB	2Cc	2Fl 2Oc	2Vl Va		Bc	C major		♫
66	Erfreut euch, ihr Herzen, BWV 66	Easter 2	1724	10 Apr 1724	ATB	SATB	Tr	2Ob Fg	2Vl Va		Bc	D major		♫
66a	Der Himmel dacht auf Anhalts Ruhm und Glück, BWV 66a	Birthday	1718	10 Dec 1718								D major	music lost	♫
67	Halt im Gedächtnis Jesum Christ, BWV 67	Quasimodogeniti	1724	16 Apr 1724	ATB	SATB	Ct	Ft 2Oa	2Vl Va		Bc	A major		♫
68	Also hat Gott die Welt geliebt, BWV 68	Pentecost 2	1725	21 May 1725	SB	SATB	Cn Co 3Tb	2Ob Ot	2Vl Va Vp		Bc	D minor		♫
69	Lobe den Herrn, meine Seele, BWV 69	Town Council	1748	26 Aug 1748	SATB	SATB	3Tr Ti	3Ob Oa Fg	2Vl Va		Bc	D major		♫
69a	Lobe den Herrn, meine Seele, BWV 69a	Trinity XII	1723	15 Aug 1723	SATB	SATB	3Tr Ti	Fl 3Ob Oa Oc Fg	2Vl Va		Bc	D major		
70	Wachet! betet! betet! wachet! BWV 70	Trinity XXVI	1723	21 Nov 1723	SATB	SATB	Tr	Ob	2Vl Va Vc		Bc	C major		♫
70a	Wachet! betet! betet! wachet! BWV 70a	Advent II	1716	6 Dec 1716	SATB	SATB	Tr?	Ob?	2Vl Va Vc		Bc	C major	string parts and text extant	
71	Gott ist mein König, BWV 71	Town Council	1708	4 Feb 1708	SATB	SATB	3Tr Ti	2Fl 2Ob Fg	2Vl Va Vc Vn	Org	Bc	D major		♫
72	Alles nur nach Gottes Willen, BWV 72	Epiphany III	1726	27 Jan 1726	SAB	SATB		2Ob	2Vl Va		Bc	A minor		♫
73	Herr, wie du willt, so schicks mit mir, BWV 73	Epiphany III	1724	23 Jan 1724	STB	SATB		2Ob	2Vl Va	Org	Bc	G minor		♫
74	Wer mich liebet, der wird mein Wort halten, BWV 74	Pentecost	1725	20 May 1725	SATB	SATB	3Tr Ti	2Ob Oc	Vs 2Vl Va		Bc	C major		♫
75	Die Elenden sollen essen, BWV 75	Trinity I	1723	30 May 1723	SATB	SATB	Tr	2Ob Oa Fg	2Vl Va		Bc	E minor		♫
76	Die Himmel erzählen die Ehre Gottes, BWV 76	Trinity II	1723	06 Jun 1723	SATB	SATB	Tr	2Ob Oa Fg	2Vl Va Vg		Bc	C major		♫
77	Du sollt Gott, deinen Herren, lieben, BWV 77	Trinity XIII	1723	22 Aug 1723	SATB	SATB	Tt	2Ob	2Vl Va		Bc	C major		♫
78	Jesu, der du meine Seele, BWV 78	Trinity XIV	1724	10 Sep 1724	SATB	SATB	Co	Ft 2Ob	2Vl Va Vn		Bc	G minor		♫
79	Gott der Herr ist Sonn und Schild, BWV 79	Reformation	1725	31 Oct 1725	SAB	SATB	2Co Ti	2Ft 2Ob	2Vl Va		Bc	G major		♫
80	Ein feste Burg ist unser Gott, BWV 80	Reformation	1731		SATB	SATB		2Ob 2Oa Oc Ot	2Vl Va Vc Vn		Bc	D major		♫
80a	Alles, was von Gott geboren, BWV 80a	Oculi	1715?									D major	music lost	
80b	Ein feste Burg ist unser Gott, BWV 80b	Reformation			SATB	SATB		2Ob 2Oa Oc Fg	2Vl Va Vc Vn		Bc	D major	fragment	
81	Jesus schläft, was soll ich hoffen? BWV 81	Epiphany IV	1724	30 Jan 1724	ATB	SATB		2Fl 2Oa	2Vl Va		Bc	E minor		♫
82	Ich habe genug, BWV 82	Purification	1727	2 Feb 1727	B			Ob	2Vl Va		Bc	C minor / E minor		♫
83	Erfreute Zeit im neuen Bunde, BWV 83	Purification	1724	2 Feb 1724	ATB	SATB	2Co	2Ob	Vs 2Vl Va		Bc	F major		♫
84	Ich bin vergnügt mit meinem Glücke, BWV 84	Septuagesimae	1727	9 Feb 1727	S	SATB		Ob	2Vl Va		Bc	E minor		♫
85	Ich bin ein guter Hirt, BWV 85	Misericordias Domini	1725	15 Apr 1725	SATB	SATB		2Ob	2Vl Va Vp		Bc	C minor		♫
86	Wahrlich, wahrlich, ich sage euch, BWV 86	Rogate	1724	14 May 1724	SATB	SATB		2Oa	2Vl Va		Bc	E major		♫
87	Bisher habt ihr nichts gebeten in meinem Namen, BWV 87	Rogate	1725	6 May 1725	ATB	SATB		2Ob Oc	2Vl Va		Bc	D minor		♫
88	Siehe, ich will viel Fischer aussenden, BWV 88	Trinity V	1726	21 Jul 1726	SATB	SATB	2Co	2Oa Ot	2Vl Va		Bc	D major		♫
89	Was soll ich aus dir machen, Ephraim, BWV 89	Trinity XXII	1723	24 Oct 1723	SAB	SATB	Co	2Ob	2Vl Va		Bc	C minor		♫
90	Es reißet euch ein schrecklich Ende, BWV 90	Trinity XXV	1723	14 Nov 1723	ATB	SATB	Tr		2Vl Va		Bc	D minor		♫
91	Gelobet seist du, Jesu Christ, BWV 91	Christmas	1724	25 Dec 1724	SATB	SATB	2Co Ti	3Ob Fg	2Vl Va		Bc	G major		♫
92	Ich hab in Gottes Herz und Sinn, BWV 92	Septuagesimae	1725	28 Jan 1725	SATB	SATB		2Oa	2Vl Va		Bc	B minor		♫
93	Wer nur den lieben Gott läßt walten, BWV 93	Trinity V	1724	09 Jul 1724	SATB	SATB		2Ob	2Vl Va		Bc	C minor		♫
94	Was frag ich nach der Welt, BWV 94	Trinity IX	1724	6 Aug 1724	SATB	SATB		Ft 2Ob Oa	2Vl Va		Bc	D major		♫
95	Christus, der ist mein Leben, BWV 95	Trinity XVI	1723	12 Sep 1723	STB	SATB	Co	2Oa	2Vl Va Vp		Bc	G major		♫
96	Herr Christ, der einge Gottessohn, BWV 96	Trinity XVIII	1724	8 Oct 1724	SATB	SATB	Co Tb	Fp Ft 2Ob	Vs 2Vl Va		Bc	F major		♫
97	In allen meinen Taten, BWV 97		1734		SATB	SATB		2Ob Fg	2Vl Va		Bc	B♭ major		♫
98	Was Gott tut, das ist wohlgetan, BWV 98	Trinity XXI	1726	10 Nov 1726	SATB	SATB		2Ob Ot	2Vl Va		Bc	B♭ major		♫
99	Was Gott tut, das ist wohlgetan, BWV 99	Trinity XV	1724	17 Sep 1724	SATB	SATB	Co	Ft Oa	2Vl Va		Bc	G major		♫
100	Was Gott tut, das ist wohlgetan, BWV 100		1732		SATB	SATB	2Co Ti	Ft Oa	2Vl Va		Bc	G major		♫
101	Nimm von uns, Herr, du treuer Gott, BWV 101	Trinity X	1724	13 Aug 1724	SATB	SATB	Cn 3Tb	Ft 2Ob Ot Oc	2Vl Va		Bc	D minor		♫
102	Herr, deine Augen sehen nach dem Glauben, BWV 102	Trinity X	1726	25 Aug 1726	ATB	SATB		Ft 2Ob	2Vl Va		Bc	G minor		♫
103	Ihr werdet weinen und heulen, BWV 103	Jubilate	1725	22 Apr 1725	SATB	SATB	Tr	Fp Ft 2Oa	2Vl Va		Bc	B minor		♫
104	Du Hirte Israel, höre, BWV 104	Misericordias Domini	1724	23 Apr 1724	TB	SATB		2Ob 2Oa Ot	2Vl Va		Bc	G major		♫
105	Herr, gehe nicht ins Gericht mit deinem Knecht, BWV 105	Trinity IX	1723	25 Jul 1723	SATB	SATB	Co(?)	2Ob	2Vl Va		Bc	G minor		♫
106	Gottes Zeit ist die allerbeste Zeit, BWV 106	Funeral	1708		AB	SATB		2Fl	2Vg		Bc	E♭ major	Actus tragicus	♫
107	Was willst du dich betrüben, BWV 107	Trinity VII	1724	23 Jul 1724	STB	SATB	Cc	2Ft 2Oa	2Vl Va		Bc	B minor		♫
108	Es ist euch gut, daß ich hingehe, BWV 108	Cantate	1725	29 Apr 1725	ATB	SATB		2Oa	2Vl Va		Bc	A major		♫
109	Ich glaube, lieber Herr, hilf meinem Unglauben, BWV 109	Trinity XXI	1723	17 Oct 1723	AT	SATB	Cc	2Ob	2Vl Va		Bc	D minor		♫
110	Unser Mund sei voll Lachens, BWV 110	Christmas	1725	25 Dec 1725	SATB	SATB	3Tr Ti	2Ft 3Ob Oa Oc Fg	2Vl Va		Bc	D major		♫
111	Was mein Gott will, das g'scheh allzeit, BWV 111	Epiphany III	1725	21 Jan 1725	SATB	SATB		2Ob	2Vl Va		Bc	A minor		♫
112	Der Herr ist mein getreuer Hirt, BWV 112	Misericordias Domini	1731	8 Apr 1731	SATB	SATB	2Co	2Oa	2Vl Va		Bc	G major		♫
113	Herr Jesu Christ, du höchstes Gut, BWV 113	Trinity XI	1724	20 Aug 1724	SATB	SATB		Ft 2Oa	2Vl Va		Bc	B minor		♫
114	Ach, lieben Christen, seid getrost, BWV 114	Trinity XVII	1724	1 Oct 1724	SATB	SATB	Co	Ft 2Ob	2Vl Va		Bc	G minor		♫
115	Mache dich, mein Geist, bereit, BWV 115	Trinity XXII	1724	5 Nov 1724	SATB	SATB	Co	Ft Oa	2Vl Va Vp		Bc	G major		♫
116	Du Friedefürst, Herr Jesu Christ, BWV 116	Trinity XXV	1724	26 Nov 1724	SATB	SATB	Co	2Oa	2Vl Va		Bc	A major		♫
117	Sei Lob und Ehr dem höchsten Gut, BWV 117		1728?		ATB	SATB		2Ft 2Ob 2Oa	2Vl Va		Bc	G major		♫
118	O Jesu Christ, meins Lebens Licht, BWV 118	Funeral	1736?			SATB	2Li Cn 3Tb					B♭ major	motet	♫
119	Preise, Jerusalem, den Herrn, BWV 119	Town Council	1723	30 Aug 1723	SATB	SATB	4Tr Ti	2Fl 3Ob 2Oc	2Vl Va		Bc	C major		♫
120	Gott, man lobet dich in der Stille, BWV 120	Town Council	1729	1742	SATB	SATB	3Tr Ti	2Oa	Vs 2Vl Va		Bc	A major		♫
120a	Herr Gott, Beherrscher aller Dinge, BWV 120a	Wedding (church)	1729		SATB	SATB	3Tr Ti	2Oa	2Vl Va		Bc	D major		♫
120b	Gott, man lobet dich in der Stille, BWV 120b		1730	26 Jun 1730									music lost	
121	Christum wir sollen loben schon, BWV 121	Christmas 2	1724	26 Dec 1724	SATB	SATB	Cn 3Tb	Oa	2Vl Va		Bc	E minor		♫
122	Das neugeborne Kindelein, BWV 122	Christmas I	1724	31 Dec 1724	SATB	SATB		3Fl 2Ob Ot	2Vl Va		Bc	G minor		♫
123	Liebster Immanuel, Herzog der Frommen, BWV 123	Epiphany	1725	6 Jan 1725	ATB	SATB		2Ft 2Oa	2Vl Va		Bc	B minor		♫
124	Meinen Jesum laß ich nicht, BWV 124	Epiphany I	1725	7 Jan 1725	SATB	SATB	Co	Oa	2Vl Va		Bc	E major		♫
125	Mit Fried und Freud ich fahr dahin, BWV 125	Purification	1725	2 Feb 1725	ATB	SATB	Co	Ft Ob Oa	2Vl Va		Bc	E minor		♫
126	Erhalt uns, Herr, bei deinem Wort, BWV 126	Sexagesimae	1725	4 Feb 1725	ATB	SATB	Tr	2Ob	2Vl Va		Bc	A major		♫
127	Herr Jesu Christ, wahr' Mensch und Gott, BWV 127	Estomihi	1725	11 Feb 1725	STB	SATB	Tr	2Fl 2Ob	2Vl Va		Bc	F major		♫
128	Auf Christi Himmelfahrt allein, BWV 128	Ascension	1725	10 May 1725	ATB	SATB	2Co Tr	2Ob Oa Oc	2Vl Va		Bc	G major		♫
129	Gelobet sei der Herr, mein Gott, BWV 129	Trinity	1727	8 Jun 1727	SAB	SATB	3Tr Ti	Ft 2Ob Oa	2Vl Va		Bc	D major		♫
130	Herr Gott, dich loben alle wir, BWV 130	St. Michaels's Day	1724	29 Sep 1724	SATB	SATB	3Tr Ti	Ft 3Ob	2Vl Va		Bc	C major		♫
131	Aus der Tiefen rufe ich, Herr, zu dir, BWV 131		1707		SATB	SATB		Oa Fg	Vl 2Va		Bc	G minor		♫
132	Bereitet die Wege, bereitet die Bahn, BWV 132	Advent IV	1715	22 Dec 1715	SATB			Ob Fg	2Vl Va Vc		Bc	A major		♫
133	Ich freue mich in dir, BWV 133	Christmas 3	1724	27 Dec 1724	SATB	SATB	Cn	2Oa	2Vl Va		Bc	D major		♫
134	Ein Herz, das seinen Jesum lebend weiß, BWV 134	Easter 3	1724	11 Apr 1724	AT	SATB		2Ob	2Vl Va Vn		Bc	B♭ major		♫
134a	Die Zeit, die Tag und Jahre macht, BWV 134a	Gratulation	1719	1 Jan 1719	AT	SATB		2Ob	2Vl Va Vn		Bc	B♭ major	secular	♫
135	Ach Herr, mich armen Sünder, BWV 135	Trinity III	1724	25 Jun 1724	ATB	SATB	Cn Tb	2Ob	2Vl Va		Bc	E minor		♫
136	Erforsche mich, Gott, und erfahre mein Herz, BWV 136	Trinity VIII	1723	18 Jul 1723	ATB	SATB	Co	2Oa	2Vl Va		Bc	A major		♫
137	Lobe den Herren, den mächtigen König der Ehren, BWV 137	Trinity XII	1725	19 Aug 1725	SATB	SATB	3Tr Ti	2Ob	2Vl Va		Bc	C major		♫
138	Warum betrübst du dich, mein Herz, BWV 138	Trinity XV	1723	05 Sep 1723	SATB	SATB		2Oa	2Vl Va		Bc	B minor		♫
139	Wohl dem, der sich auf seinen Gott, BWV 139	Trinity XXIII	1724	12 Nov 1724	SATB	SATB		2Oa	2Vl Va		Bc	E major		♫
140	Wachet auf, ruft uns die Stimme, BWV 140	Trinity XXVII	1731	25 Nov 1731	STB	SATB	Co	2Ob Ot	Vs 2Vl Va		Bc	E♭ major		♫
141	Das ist je gewißlich wahr, BWV 141				SATB	ATB			2Vl Va		Bc	G major	Georg Philipp Telemann	♫
142	Uns ist ein Kind geboren, BWV 142				ATB	SATB		2Fl 2Ob	2Vl Va		Bc	A minor	Johann Kuhnau?	♫
143	Lobe den Herrn, meine Seele, BWV 143	New Year	1708		STB	SATB	3Cc Ti	Fg	2Vl Va Vc		Bc	B♭ major		♫
144	Nimm, was dein ist, und gehe hin, BWV 144	Septuagesimae	1724	6 Feb 1724	SAT	SATB		2Ob Oa	2Vl Va		Bc	B minor		♫
145	Ich lebe, mein Herze, zu deinem Ergötzen, BWV 145	Easter 3	1729	19 Apr 1729	STB	SATB	Tr	Ft 2Oa	2Vl Va		Bc	D major		♫
146	Wir müssen durch viel Trübsal, BWV 146	Jubilate	1726?	12 May 1726	SATB	SATB		Ft 2Ob 2Oa Ot	2Vl Va	Org	Bc	D minor		♫
147	Herz und Mund und Tat und Leben, BWV 147	Visitation	1723	2 Jul 1723	SATB	SATB	Tr	2Ob Oa 2Oc Fg	2Vl Va Vc		Bc	C major		♫
147a	Herz und Mund und Tat und Leben, BWV 147a	Advent IV	1716?										music lost	
148	Bringet dem Herrn Ehre seines Namens, BWV 148	Trinity XVII	1723	19 Sep 1723	AT	SATB	Cl	2Oa Oc	2Vl Va		Bc	D major		♫
149	Man singet mit Freuden vom Sieg, BWV 149	St. Michael's Day	1728	29 Sep 1728	SATB	SATB	3Tr Ti	3Ob Fg	2Vl Va Vn		Bc	D major		♫
150	Nach dir, Herr, verlanget mich, BWV 150		1707?		SATB	SATB		Fg	2Vl		Bc	B minor		♫
151	Süßer Trost, mein Jesus kömmt, BWV 151	Christmas 3	1725	27 Dec 1725	SATB	SATB		Ft Oa	2Vl Va		Bc	G major		♫
152	Tritt auf die Glaubensbahn, BWV 152	Christmas I	1714	30 Dec 1714	SB			Fl Ob	Vm Vg		Bc	E minor		♫
153	Schau, lieber Gott, wie meine Feind, BWV 153	New Year I	1724	2 Jan 1724	ATB	SATB			2Vl Va		Bc	A minor		♫
154	Mein liebster Jesus ist verloren, BWV 154	Epiphany I	1724	9 Jan 1724	ATB	SATB		2Oa	2Vl Va		Bc	B minor		♫
155	Mein Gott, wie lang, ach lange? BWV 155	Epiphany II	1716	19 Jan 1716	SATB	SATB		Fg	2Vl Va		Bc	D minor		♫
156	Ich steh mit einem Fuß im Grabe, BWV 156	Epiphany III	1729	23 Jan 1729	ATB	SATB		Ob	2Vl Va		Bc	F major		♫
157	Ich lasse dich nicht, du segnest mich denn, BWV 157	Funeral	1727	6 Feb 1727	TB	SATB		Ft Ob Oa	2Vl Vt		Bc	B minor		♫
158	Der Friede sei mit dir, BWV 158	Easter 3	1731?		SB	SATB		Ob	Vs		Bc	D major		♫
159	Sehet, wir gehn hinauf gen Jerusalem, BWV 159	Estomihi	1729	27 Feb 1729	ATB	SATB		Ob	2Vl Va		Bc	C minor		♫
160	Ich weiß, daß mein Erlöser lebt, BWV 160				T			Fg	Vl		Bc	C major	Georg Philipp Telemann	♫
161	Komm, du süße Todesstunde, BWV 161	Trinity XVI	1716	27 Sep 1716	AT	SATB		2Ft	2Vl Va		Bc	C major		♫
162	Ach! ich sehe, itzt, da ich zur Hochzeit gehe, BWV 162	Trinity XX	1715?	3 Nov 1715	SATB	SATB	Ct	Fg	2Vl Va		Bc	A minor		♫
163	Nur jedem das Seine, BWV 163	Trinity XXIII	1715	24 Nov 1715	SATB	SATB			2Vl Va 2Vc		Bc	B minor		♫
164	Ihr, die ihr euch von Christo nennet, BWV 164	Trinity XIII	1725	26 Aug 1725	SATB	SATB		2Ft 2Ob	2Vl Va		Bc	G minor		♫
165	O heilges Geist- und Wasserbad, BWV 165	Trinity	1715	16 Jun 1715	SATB	SATB		Fg	2Vl Va Vc		Bc	G major		♫
166	Wo gehest du hin? BWV 166	Cantate	1724	7 May 1724	ATB	SATB		Ob	2Vl Va		Bc	B♭ major		♫
167	Ihr Menschen, rühmet Gottes Liebe, BWV 167	St. John's Day	1723	24 Jun 1723	SATB	SATB	Cl	Ob Oc	2Vl Va		Bc	G major		♫
168	Tue Rechnung! Donnerwort, BWV 168	Trinity IX	1725	29 Jul 1725	SATB	SATB		2Oa	2Vl Va		Bc	B minor		♫
169	Gott soll allein mein Herze haben, BWV 169	Trinity XVIII	1726	20 Oct 1726	A	SATB		2Ob Ot	2Vl Va	Org	Bc	D major	First movement from BWV 1053	♫
170	Vergnügte Ruh, beliebte Seelenlust, BWV 170	Trinity VI	1726	28 Jul 1726	A			Oa	2Vl Va	Org	Bc	D major		♫
171	Gott, wie dein Name, so ist auch dein Ruhm, BWV 171	New Year	1729	1 Jan 1729	SATB	SATB	3Tr Ti	2Ob	2Vl Va		Bc	D major		♫
172	Erschallet, ihr Lieder, erklinget, ihr Saiten! BWV 172	Pentecost	1714	20 May 1714	SATB	SATB	3Tr Ti	Fg	2Vl 2Va	Org	Bc	C major / D major		♫
173	Erhöhtes Fleisch und Blut, BWV 173	Pentecost 2	1724	29 May 1724	SATB	SATB		2Ft	2Vl Va		Bc	D major		♫
173a	Durchlauchtster Leopold, BWV 173a	Birthday	1722		SB			2Ft Fg	Vl Va Vn		Bc	D major	secular	♫
174	Ich liebe den Höchsten von ganzem Gemüte, BWV 174	Pentecost 2	1729	6 Jun 1729	ATB	SATB	2Cc	2Ob Ot	3Vs 3Va 3Vc 2Vl Va		Bc	G major		♫
175	Er rufet seinen Schafen mit Namen, BWV 175	Pentecost 3	1725	22 May 1725	ATB	SATB	2Tr	3Fl	2Vl Va Vp		Bc	G major		♫
176	Es ist ein trotzig und verzagt Ding, BWV 176	Trinity	1725	27 May 1725	SAB	SATB		2Ob Oc	2Vl Va		Bc	C minor		♫
177	Ich ruf zu dir, Herr Jesu Christ, BWV 177	Trinity IV	1732	6 Jul 1732	SAT	SATB		2Ob Oc Fg	Vs 2Vl Va		Bc	G minor		♫
178	Wo Gott der Herr nicht bei uns hält, BWV 178	Trinity VIII	1724	30 Jul 1724	ATB	SATB	Co	2Ob 2Oa	2Vl Va		Bc	A minor		♫
179	Siehe zu, daß deine Gottesfurcht nicht Heuchelei sei, BWV 179	Trinity XI	1723	8 Aug 1723	STB	SATB		2Ob 2Oc	2Vl Va		Bc	G major		♫
180	Schmücke dich, o liebe Seele, BWV 180	Trinity XX	1724	22 Oct 1724	SATB	SATB		2Fl 2Ft Ob Oc	2Vl Va Vp		Bc	F major		♫
181	Leichtgesinnte Flattergeister, BWV 181	Sexagesimae	1724	13 Feb 1724	SATB	SATB	Tr	Ft Ob	2Vl Va		Bc	E minor		♫
182	Himmelskönig, sei willkommen, BWV 182	Palm Sunday	1714	25 Mar 1714	ATB	SATB		Fl	Vs Vl 2Va Vc		Bc	G major		♫
183	Sie werden euch in den Bann tun, BWV 183	Exaudi	1725	13 May 1725	SATB	SATB		2Oa 2Oc	2Vl Va Vp		Bc	A minor		♫
184	Erwünschtes Freudenlicht, BWV 184	Pentecost 3	1724	30 May 1724	SAT	SATB		2Ft	2Vl Va		Bc	G major		♫
185	Barmherziges Herze der ewigen Liebe, BWV 185	Trinity IV	1715	14 Jul 1715	SATB	SATB		Ob Fg	2Vl Va		Bc	F♯ minor		♫
186	Ärgre dich, o Seele, nicht, BWV 186	Trinity VII	1723	11 Jul 1723	SATB	SATB		2Ob Ot Fg	2Vl Va		Bc	G minor		♫
186a	Ärgre dich, o Seele, nicht, BWV 186a	Advent III	1716?										music lost	
187	Es wartet alles auf dich, BWV 187	Trinity VII	1726	4 Aug 1726	SAB	SATB		2Ob	2Vl Va		Bc	G minor		♫
188	Ich habe meine Zuversicht, BWV 188	Trinity XXI	1728	17 Oct 1728	SATB	SATB		Ob	2Vl Va Vc	Org	Bc	D minor		♫
189	Meine Seele rühmt und preist, BWV 189				T			Fl Ob	Vl		Bc	B♭ major	G. M. Hoffmann?	♫
190	Singet dem Herrn ein neues Lied, BWV 190	New Year	1724	1 Jan 1724	ATB	SATB	3Tr Ti	3Ob Oa Fg	2Vl Va		Bc	D major	incomplete	♫
190a	Singet dem Herrn ein neues Lied, BWV 190a		1730	25 Jun 1730									music lost	
191	Gloria in excelsis Deo, BWV 191	Christmas	1742?	25 Dec 1745	ST	SSATB	3Tr Ti	2Ft 2Ob	2Vl Va		Bc	D major	in Latin	♫
192	Nun danket alle Gott, BWV 192		1730	31 Oct 1730	SB	SATB		2Ft 2Ob	2Vl Va		Bc	G major	incomplete	♫
193	Ihr Tore zu Zion, BWV 193	Town Council	1727	25 Aug 1727	SA	SATB		2Ob	2Vl Va		Bc	D major	incomplete	♫
193a	Ihr Häuser des Himmels, ihr scheinenden Lichter, BWV 193a		1727	3 Aug 1727									secular; music lost	
194	Höchsterwünschtes Freudenfest, BWV 194	Trinity	1723	2 Nov 1723	STB	SATB		3Ob Fg	2Vl Va		Bc	B♭ major	Organ Störmthal	♫
195	Dem Gerechten muß das Licht, BWV 195	Wedding (church)	1737		SATB	SATB	2Co 3Tr Ti	2Ft 2Ob 2Oa	2Vl Va Vc		Bc	D major		♫
196	Der Herr denket an uns, BWV 196	Wedding (church)	1708?		STB	SATB			2Vl Va Vc		Bc	C major		♫
197	Gott ist unsre Zuversicht, BWV 197	Wedding (church)	1736?		SAB	SATB	3Tr Ti	2Ob 2Oa Fg	2Vl Va		Bc	D major		♫
197a	Ehre sei Gott in der Höhe, BWV 197a	Christmas	1728		AB	SATB		2Ft Oa Fg	2Vl Va Vc		Bc	D major	incomplete	♫
198	Laß, Fürstin, laß noch einen Strahl, BWV 198	Funeral	1727	17 Oct 1727	SATB	SATB		2Ft 2Oa	2Vl Va 2Vg	2Lt	Bc	B minor	Trauerode (secular)	♫
199	Mein Herze schwimmt im Blut, BWV 199	Trinity XI	1714	12 Aug 1714	S			Ob	2Vl Va Vp		Bc	C minor		♫
200	Bekennen will ich seinen Namen, BWV 200	Purification	1735		A				2Vl		Bc	E major	incomplete	
201	Geschwinde, ihr wirbelnden Winde, BWV 201	Dramma per musica	1729		SATTBB		3Tr Ti	2Ft 2Ob Oa	2Vl Va		Bc	D major	secular	♫
202	Weichet nur, betrübte Schatten, BWV 202	Wedding	1718?		S			Ob	2Vl Va		Bc	G major	secular	♫
203	Amore traditore, BWV 203	unknown	1718–19		B					Cemb		A minor	secular (in Italian)	♫
204	Ich bin in mir vergnügt, BWV 204	unknown	1727?		S			Ft 2Ob	2Vl Va		Bc	B♭ major	secular	♫
205	Zerreißet, zersprenget, zertrümmert die Gruft, BWV 205	Dramma per musica	1725	3 Aug 1725	SATB	SATB	2Co 3Tr Ti Tb	2Ft 2Ob Oa	2Vl Va Vg Vm		Bc	D major	secular	♫
205a	Blast Lärmen, ihr Feinde, BWV 205a	Dramma per musica	1734?	19 Feb 1734	SATB	SATB							music lost	
206	Schleicht, spielende Wellen, BWV 206	Birthday	1736	7 Oct 1736	SATB	SATB	3Tr Ti	3Ft 2Ob 2Oa	2Vl Va		Bc	D major	secular	♫
207	Vereinigte Zwietracht der wechselnden Saiten, BWV 207	Dramma per musica	1726		SATB	SATB	3Tr Ti	2Ft 2Ot	2Vl Va		Bc	D major	secular	♫
207a	Auf, schmetternde Töne der muntern Trompeten, BWV 207a	Dramma per musica	1735?	3 Aug 1735	SATB	SATB	3Tr Ti	2Ft 2Ot	2Vl Va		Bc	D major	secular	♫
208	Was mir behagt, ist nur die muntre Jagd, BWV 208	secular	1713		SSTB	SATB	2Cc	2Fl 2Ob Ot Fg	2Vl Va Vc		Bc	F major	Hunting cantata	♫
208a	Was mir behagt, ist nur die muntre Jagd, BWV 208a	Birthday	1742	3 Aug 1742									music lost	
209	Non sa che sia dolore, BWV 209	unknown	1729		S			Ft	2Vl Va		Bc	B minor	secular (in Italian)	♫
210	O holder Tag, erwünschte Zeit, BWV 210	Wedding	1740?		S			Ft Oa	2Vl Va Vn		Bc	A major	secular	♫
210a	O angenehme Melodei, BWV 210a	Homage cantata	1729	12 Jan 1729	S			Ft Oa	2Vl Va Vn		Bc	A major	incomplete	♫
211	Schweigt stille, plaudert nicht, BWV 211	secular	1735?		STB			Ft	2Vl Va	Cemb		G major	Coffee cantata	♫
212	Mer hahn en neue Oberkeet, BWV 212	secular	1742	30 Aug 1742	SB		Co	Ft	2Vl Va	Cemb		A major	Peasant cantata	♫
213	Laßt uns sorgen, laßt uns wachen, BWV 213 (Herkules auf dem Scheideweg)	Birthday	1733	5 Sep 1733	SATB	SATB	2Cc	2Ob Oa	2Vl 2Va		Bc	F major	secular	♫
214	Tönet, ihr Pauken! Erschallet, Trompeten! BWV 214	Birthday	1733	8 Dec 1733	SATB	SATB	2Tr Ti	2Ft 2Ob Oa	2Vl Va Vc Vn		Bc	D major	secular	♫
215	Preise dein Glücke, gesegnetes Sachsen, BWV 215	Anniversary of election	1734	5 Oct 1734	STB	SATB SATB	3Tr Ti	2Ft 2Ob Fg	2Vl Va		Bc	D major	secular	♫
216	Vergnügte Pleißenstadt, BWV 216	Wedding	1728	5 Feb 1728	SA							C major	fragment	
216a	Erwählte Pleißenstadt, BWV 216a		1728?									C major	music lost	
217	Gedenke, Herr, wie es uns gehet, BWV 217				SATB	SATB		Ft	2Vl Va		Bc	D minor	Johann Christoph Altnickol	♫
218	Gott der Hoffnung erfülle euch, BWV 218				SATB	SATB	2Co		2Vl Va		Bc	D major	Georg Philipp Telemann	♫
219	Siehe, es hat überwunden der Löwe, BWV 219				SAB	SATB	2Tr		2Vl Va		Bc	D major	Georg Philipp Telemann	♫
220	Lobt ihn mit Herz und Munde, BWV 220				ATB	SATB		Ft 2Ob	2Vl Va		Bc	B minor	?	♫
221	Wer sucht die Pracht, wer wünscht den Glanz, BWV 221							Fg	Vs 2Vl Va Vc	Org		D major	?	
222	Mein Odem ist schwach, BWV 222				SAB	SATB			2Vl Va	Org		G minor - D major	Johann Ernst Bach	
223	Meine Seele soll Gott loben, BWV 223											D minor	Johann Ernst Bach?	
224	Reißt euch los, bedrängte Sinnen, BWV 224												fragment	
244a	Klagt, Kinder, klagt es aller Welt, BWV 244a	Funeral	1729									B minor	music lost	
249a	Entfliehet, verschwindet, entweichet, ihr Sorgen, BWV 249a	Birthday	1725	23 Feb 1725	SATB		3Tr Ti	2Fl Ft 2Ob Fg	2Vl Va		Bc	D major	Shepherds' cantata	
249b	Verjaget, zerstreuet, zerrüttet, ihr Sterne, BWV 249b				SATB								secular; music lost	
1045	Violin Concerto movement, BWV 1045		1743–46?			SATB?	3Tr Ti	2Ob	Vl (solo); 2Vl Va		Bc	D major	Sinfonia, probably for a lost cantata	♫
1083	Tilge, Höchster, meine Sünden, BWV 1083		1743?		SA				2Vl Va		Bc	F minor	based on Pergolesi's Stabat Mater	
1127	Alles mit Gott und nichts ohn' ihn, BWV 1127		1713		S				2Vl Va		Bc	C major		
Anh. 1	Gesegnet ist die Zuversicht				SATB			2Ft	2Vl Va		Bc		music lost	
Anh. 2	Cantata for Trinity XIX												music lost	
Anh. 3	Gott, gib dein Gerichte dem Könige		1730	28 Aug 1730									music lost	
Anh. 4	Wünschet Jerusalem Glück		1726?										music lost	
Anh. 4a	Wünschet Jerusalem Glück	200th Anniversary of the Augsburg Confession	1730	27 Jun 1730									music lost	
Anh. 5	Lobet den Herrn, alle seine Heerscharen		1718										music lost	
Anh. 6	Dich loben die lieblichen Strahlen der Sonne		1720										music lost	
Anh. 7	Heut ist gewiß ein guter Tag		1720										music lost	
Anh. 8	Neujahrskantate		1723	1 Jan 1723									music lost	
Anh. 9	Entfernet euch, ihr heitern Sterne		1727	12 May 1727									music lost	
Anh. 10	So kämpfet nur, ihr muntern Töne												music lost	
Anh. 11	Es lebe der König, der Vater im Lande, BWV Anh. 11		1732	3 Aug 1732									music lost	
Anh. 12	Frohes Volk, vernügte Sachsen		1733	3 Aug 1733									music lost	
Anh. 13	Willkommen! Ihr herrschenden Götter der Erden		1738	28 Apr 1738									music lost	
Anh. 14	Sein Segen fließt daher wie ein Strom		1725	12 Feb 1725									music lost	
Anh. 15	Siehe der Hüter Israel				SATB		3Tr Ti	2Ob	2Vl Va	Cemb			music lost	
Anh. 16	Schließt die Gruft! ihr Trauerglocken												music lost	
Anh. 17	Mein Gott, nimm die gerechte Seele				SATB			2Oa Fg	2Vl Va		Bc		music lost	
Anh. 18	Froher Tag, verlangte Stunden				SATB	SATB							music lost	
Anh. 19	Thomana saß annoch betrübt				SATB	SATB							music lost	
Anh. 20	Lateinische Ode				SATB								music lost	
Anh. 21	Meine Seel erhebt den Herren, BWV Anh. 21				S			Fl	Vl	Org			Magnificat in A minor Melchior Hoffmann	
Anh. 190	Ich bin ein Pilgrim auf der Welt												music lost	
Anh. 191	Leb ich oder leb ich nicht												music lost	
Anh. 192	Ratswahlkantate Mühlhausen 1709												music lost	
Anh. 193	Herrscher des Himmels, König der Ehren		1740	29 Aug 1740									music lost	
Anh. 194	Cantata for the birthday of Johann August of Anhalt-Zerbst												music lost	
Anh. 195	Murmelt nur, ihr heitern Bäche												music lost	
Anh. 196	Auf, süß entzückende Gewalt												music lost	
Anh. 197	Ihr wallenden Wolken												music lost	
Anh. 199	Siehe, eine Jungfrau ist schwanger												music lost	
Anh. 209	Liebster Gott, vergißt Du mich												music lost	
Anh. 210	Wo sind meine Wunderwerke		1734	4 Oct 1734									music lost	
Anh. 211	Der Herr ist freundlich dem, der auf ihn harret		1729	18 Jan 1729									music lost	
Anh. 212	Vergnügende Flammen, verdoppelt die Macht		1729	26 Jul 1729									music lost	

== Literature ==
- BWV Bach-Werke-Verzeichnis, Breitkopf & Härtel, 1998
- NBA Neue Bach-Ausgabe, Bärenreiter, 1954 to 2007
- Z. Philip Ambrose Texts of the Complete Vocal Works with English Translation and Commentary University of Vermont 2005–2011
- Walter F. Bischof. The Bach Cantatas University of Alberta 2003–2010
- Alfred Dürr: Johann Sebastian Bach: Die Kantaten. Bärenreiter, Kassel 1999, ISBN 3-7618-1476-3 (in German)
- Alfred Dürr: The Cantatas of J.S. Bach, Oxford University Press, 2006. ISBN 0-19-929776-2
- Werner Neumann: Handbuch der Kantaten J.S.Bachs, 1947, 5th ed. 1984, ISBN 3-7651-0054-4
- Martin Petzold: Bach-Kommentar. Theologisch-musikwissenschaftliche Kommentierung der geistlichen Vokalwerke Johann Sebastian Bachs.
  - Vol. I: Die geistlichen Kantaten des 1. bis 27. Trinitatis-Sonntages, Kassel/Stuttgart 2004.
  - Vol. II: Die geistlichen Kantaten vom 1. Advent bis zum Trinitatisfest, Kassel/Stuttgart 2007.
  - Vol. III in preparation.
- Reginald Lane Poole. "A List of Church Cantatas in Presumed Order of Production" pp. 131–138 in Sebastian Bach. London: Sampson Low, Marston, Searle, & Rivington, 1882.
- Hans-Joachim Schulze: Die Bach-Kantaten: Einführungen zu sämtlichen Kantaten Johann Sebastian Bachs Leipzig: Evangelische Verlags-Anstalt; Stuttgart: Carus-Verlag 2006 (Edition Bach-Archiv Leipzig) ISBN 3-374-02390-8 (EVA), ISBN 3-89948-073-2 (in German)
- Craig Smith: programme notes, Emmanuel Music
- Charles Sanford Terry. "Appendix II: The Church Cantatas Arranged Chronologically", pp. 163–224 in Johann Sebastian Bach: His Life, Art, and Work. Translated from the German of Johann Nikolaus Forkel. With notes and appendices. London: Constable; New York: Harcourt, Brace and Howe. 1920. (e-version at Gutenberg.org)
- Christoph Wolff/Ton Koopman: Die Welt der Bach-Kantaten Verlag J.B. Metzler, Stuttgart, Weimar 2006 ISBN 978-3-476-02127-4 (in German)
- Philippe and Gérard Zwang. Guide pratique des cantates de Bach. Second revised and augmented edition. L'Harmattan, 2005. ISBN 9782296426078
