= Concerto for Two Violas (Telemann) =

Composition by Georg Philipp Telemann

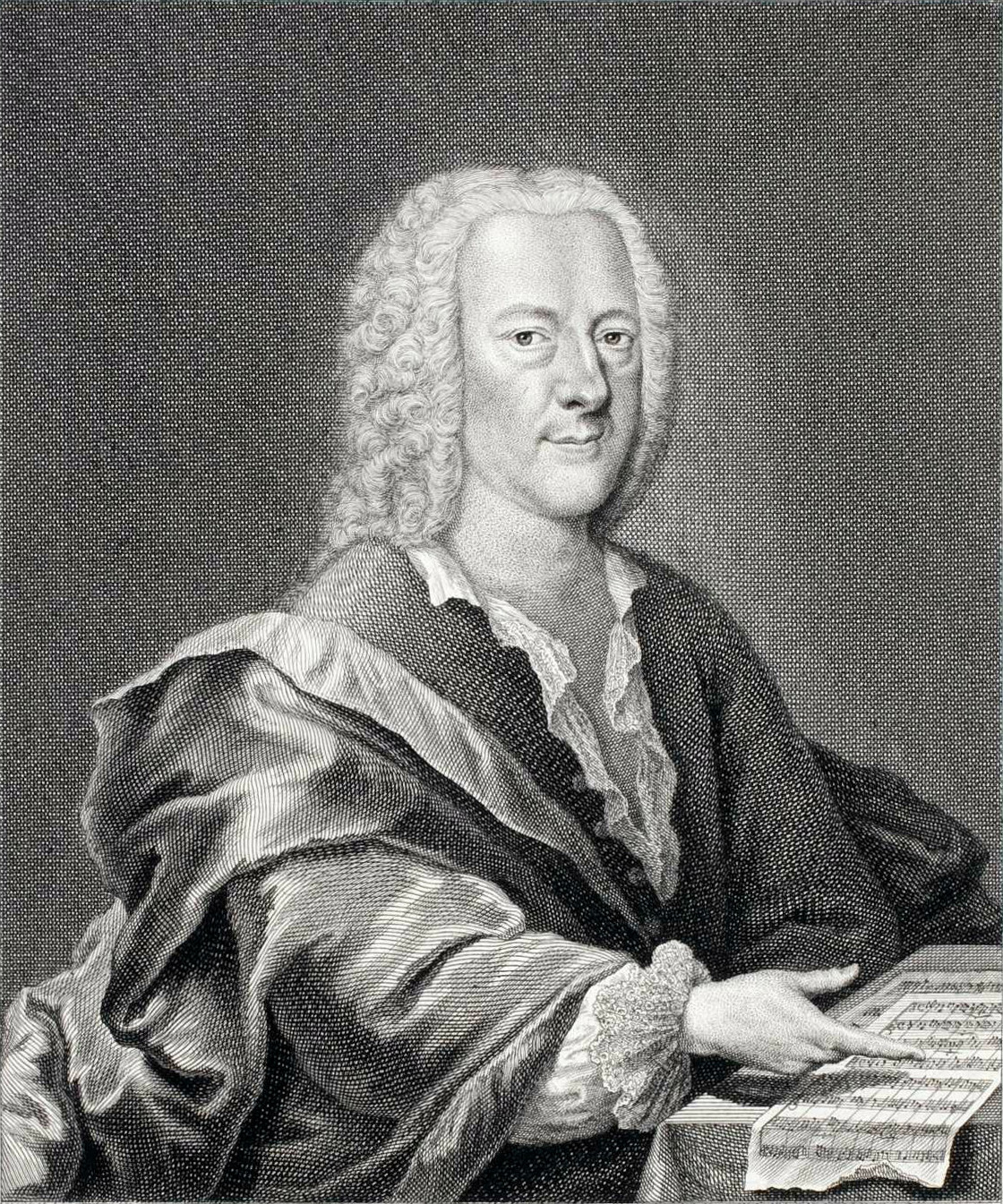
Georg Philipp Telemann c. 1745, engraving by Georg Lichtensteger

The Concerto for Two Violas in G major, TWV 52:G3, is a work by Georg Philipp Telemann. Telemann was famous for writing concertos for various combinations of instruments; this concerto is unusual in that at the time the viola was not a popular solo instrument. However, Telemann was a viola player himself, and wrote for the instrument. One of his most famous concertos was viola in G major TWV 51:G9. The piece is scored for two violas, strings, and harpsichord.

The work was written soon after Telemann's only visit to France, from late September/early October 1737 to May 1738 and has some distinctively French characteristics. For example, the work bears the title "Concert" rather than the more usual "Concerto" or "Konzert" and the individual movements all have French names.

This concerto has four movements:

1. Lent
2. Gai
3. Large
4. Vif

A usual performance lasts about 12 minutes.
