= Uns ist ein Kind geboren (Telemann) =

Christmas cantata by Telemann

- Church cantata by Georg Philipp Telemann
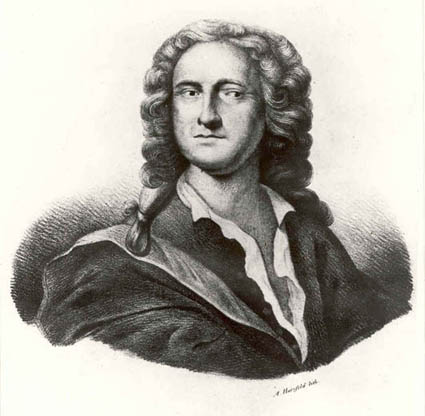
- Telemann c. 1725
- Catalogue: TWV 1:452
- Occasion: Christmas Day
- Written: 1711
- Text: by Gottfried Simonis
- Language: German
- Composed: 1720
- Scoring: 2 sopranos; alto; tenor; bass; choir; flauti traversi or horns; oboes; strings; basso continuo

Uns ist ein Kind geboren (Unto us a child is born), TWV 1:1452, is a Christmas cantata for the first day of Christmas by Georg Philipp Telemann to a libretto in German by Gottfried Simonis that was first published in 1711. Telemann composed it in Frankfurt in 1720. It is structured in eight movements and is scored for five vocal soloists, a four-part choir, flauto traversi or horns, oboes, strings and continuo.

== History ==
Telemann composed Uns ist ein Kind geboren when he was music director in Frankfurt at the Barfüßerkirche and the Katharinenkirche from 1712 to 1721. During his tenure, he composed five yearly cantata cycles, according to his autobiography. Even when he moved to Hamburg, he kept composing cantatas for Frankfurt in order to retain Frankfurt citizenship. Around 800 copies of cantata scores were kept in archives when Telemann died in 1767. They were transferred to municipal archives in 1887, and further to the municipal library in 1897, which became the Universitätsbibliothek Johann Christian Senckenberg.

=== 1720 cantata ===
For the 1720 cantata, he used a libretto by Gottfried Simonis, which contains biblical text, chorale and free poetry, beginning with verse 5 from Isaiah 9.

A libretto with the same title was published in 1711 in a collection of librettos by the writer, theologian, pastor and theorist Erdmann Neumeister. A printed libretto, based on this text, survives in the Stadtgeschichtliches Museum of Leipzig for a cantata with this title because J. S. Bach performed it there. That cantata was believed to have been composed by Bach and was published as one of his works in the 19th century by the Bach-Gesellschaft as Uns ist ein Kind geboren, BWV 142. It was possibly composed by Bach's predecessor, Johann Kuhnau.

Telemann's cantata is closed by the last stanza of Kaspar Füger's hymn "Wir Christenleut". In the opening duet, he used elements from Hanakish and Polish folk music which he may have heard in his former position as kapellmeister for Count Erdmann von Promnitz, in Pleß and Kraków. While Telemann often used folk music in his compositions, it was rare in his church music. He may have wanted to refer to the pastoral music of the shepherds.

Telemann's cantata is extant in two forms: a set of parts, with Johann Balthasar König as the principal copyist, dates to the 1720s and is held by the Frankfurt University Library, and a copied score from the period is kept by the Berlin Singakademie. The parts source is regarded as preferable because it comes from the Frankfurt Telemann tradition. The other copy misses colla parte instruments, ornaments and figured bass.

The cantata was published in 1963, edited by Helga Jaedtke, for Möseler, Wolfenbüttel. It was published as part of the Frankfurter Telemann Editions by Habsburger Verlag in 2003. It was published in a critical edition by Carus in 2008, edited by Klaus Hofmann. It was published in 2019 by Bärenreiter, edited by Simon Rettelbach, as part of Telemann, Georg Philipp: Neues Lied. Kirchenmusiken vom 21. bis 26. Sonntag nach Trinitatis und vom 1. Advent bis zum 3. Weihnachtstag, volume 53 of his compositions.

==== Movements ====
The cantata is scored for five vocal soloists (two sopranos, alto, tenor and bass), a four-part choir, two flauto traversi or horns, two oboes, two violins, viola and continuo.

The cantata is structured in eight movements:

1. Chorus: Uns ist ein Kind geboren (For unto us a child is born)
2. Recitative (bass): Ergötze dich, du Christenheit (Rejoice, Christianity)
3. Aria (tenor): Liebster Jesu, sei willkommen (Dearest Jesus, be welcome)
4. Recitative (alto): Dein Einzug in die Welt (Your entry into the world)
5. Chorus: Ehre sei Gott (Glory to God)
6. Recitative (tenor): Gib, liebster Gott (Grant, dearest God)
7. Aria (alto): Jesus ist mein Heil und Leben (Jesus is my salvation and my life)
8. Chorus: Halleluja! Gelobt sei Gott (Halleluja! Praise be to God)

==== Performances ====
After the first performance in Frankfurt on 25 December 1720, Telemann performed the cantata at least two more times in Hamburg, on 26 December 1724 at the Nikolaikirche and on 25 December 1728 at St. Petri.

In 2011, the Christoph Graupner Gesellschaft held a Baroque concert for Epiphany at St. Cäcilia in Heusenstamm which combined the cantata with similar works by Graupner and Vivaldi. In 2016, Diego Fasolis conducted the cantata as the final work in a Christmas concert of music by Telemann. It was performed by soloists, the choir of Radiotelevisione svizzera and the I Barocchisti at the station's Auditorio Stelio Molo in Lugano and recorded for radio.
