= Telemann-Werke-Verzeichnis =

Telemann's works

The Telemann-Werke-Verzeichnis (Telemann Works Catalogue), abbreviated TWV, is the numbering system identifying compositions by Georg Philipp Telemann, published by musicologist Martin Ruhnke.

The prefix TWV is generally followed by a genre number, a letter indicating the key (in some cases), and a work number. The genre number indicates the general type or medium of the work. A major key is in upper case, a minor key in lower case. The second number is the work's number within the genre. For example, Telemann's Concerto polonois in B flat major for strings and basso continuo is TWV 43:B3. His Orchestral suite in D major is TWV 55:D18, and his Overture in G minor is TWV 55:g4.

Vocal works were catalogued in a similar way by Werner Menke in the Telemann-Vokalwerke-Verzeichnis (Telemann Vocal Works Catalogue), abbreviated TVWV. For example, Telemann's Johannes-Passion is TVWV 5:42. His Times of the Day cantata is TVWV 20:39.

== Genre numbering ==
Genres of vocal works are numbered from 1 to 25, and usually prefixed by TVWV. Genres of instrumental works are numbered from 30 to 55.

The genres are numbered as follows:

=== Vocal music (TVWV) ===
==== Sacred vocal (TVWV 1–15) ====
TVWV 1 – Church cantatas
Church cantatas for occasions of the liturgical year:
- Das ist je gewißlich wahr, TWV 1:183 (= BWV 141)
- Gott der Hoffnung erfülle euch, TWV 1:634 (= BWV 218)
- Ich weiß, daß mein Erlöser lebt, TWV 1:877 (= BWV 160)
- Ich will den Kreuzweg gerne gehen, TWV 1:884
- German Magnificat (cantatas) TWV 1:1104–1108
- Siehe, es hat überwunden der Löwe, TWV 1:1328 (= BWV 219)
- Singet dem Herrn ein neues Lied, TWV 1:1342–1345
- So du mit deinem Munde bekennest, TWV 1:1350 (first movement of this cantata, TWV 1:1350/1, reused as BWV 145/b, second movement of cantata Ich lebe, mein Herze, zu deinem Ergötzen, BWV 145)
- Uns ist ein Kind geboren, TWV 1:1451
- Uns ist ein Kind geboren, TWV 1:1452
- Wer ist der, so von Sodom kommt, TWV 1:1585 (first two movements of this cantata reused in the Passion pasticcio Wer ist der, so von Edom kömmt)

TVWV 2 – Cantatas for consecrations
Cantatas for consecrations
- Oratorium zur Einweyhung der neuen St.-Michaelis-Kirche, TWV 2:12

TVWV 3 – Cantatas for the ordination of preachers
Cantatas for the ordination of preachers

TVWV 4 – Cantatas for funerals
Cantatas for funerals

TVWV 5 – Passion oratorios and Passions
Passion oratorios and Passions:
- Mich vom Stricke meiner Sünden, TWV 5:1 = Telemann's Brockes Passion

TVWV 6 – Sacred oratorios
Sacred oratorios:
- Der Tag des Gerichts, TWV 6:8

TVWV 7 – Psalms
Psalms:
- Psalm 96: Singet dem Herrn ein neues Lied, TWV 7:30.

TVWV 8 – Motets
Motets:
- Ein feste Burg ist unser Gott, TWV 8:7
- Jauchzet dem Herrn alle Welt, TWV 8:10 (= BWV Anh. 160)

TVWV 9 – Masses, Magnificat, and individual works
Masses, Magnificat, and individual works

TVWV 10 – Collections
Collections

TVWV 11 – Cantatas and serenades for weddings
Cantatas and serenades for weddings

TVWV 12 – Compositions for birthdays
Compositions for birthdays
- De Danske, Norske og Tÿdske Undersaatters Glæde, TWV 12:10

TVWV 13 – Works for political celebrations
Works for political celebrations

TVWV 14 – Compositions for schools in Hamburg and Altona
Compositions for schools in Hamburg and Altona

TVWV 15 – Oratorios and serenades for the Mayor
Oratorios and serenades for the Mayor:

==== Secular vocal (TVWV 20–25) ====
TVWV 20 – Secular cantatas
Secular cantatas

TVWV 21 – Operas and arias
Operas and arias

TVWV 22 – Contributions to operas by other composers
Contributions to operas by other composers

TVWV 23 – Prologues for operas
Prologues for operas

TVWV 24 – Secular oratorios
Secular oratorios
- Hamburger Admiralitätsmusik, TWV 24:1

TVWV 25 – Pedagogical works, odes and songs
Pedagogical works, odes and songs

=== Instrumental music (TWV) ===
Mixed collections:

- Der getreue Music-Meister (includes works listed in TWV 32 and 40–41, and works by other composers, e.g. BWV 1074)
- Essercizii musici (includes works listed in TWV 32 and 41–42)
- Tafelmusik (includes works listed in TWV 41–43, 50 and 53–55)

==== Music for keyboard instruments and lute (TWV 30–39) ====
TWV 30 – Fugues for keyboard
Fugues for keyboard

TWV 31 – Chorale preludes
Chorale preludes
- Fugierende und verändernde Choräle, TWV 31:1–48 (includes BWV Anh. 56 = TWV 31:8)

TWV 32 – Suites for harpsichord
Suites for harpsichord:
- Ouverture in G major, TWV 32:13 (BWV 840, "Courante", is its 2nd movement, formerly attributed to Bach)
- Suite in A major, TWV 32:14 (= BWV 824, No. 47 in Klavierbüchlein für Wilhelm Friedemann Bach)

TWV 33 – Fantasies, sonatas, concertos for harpsichord
Fantasies, sonatas, concertos for harpsichord
- 36 Fantasias for Harpsichord, TWV 33:1–36

TWV 34 – Minuets for harpsichord
Minuets for harpsichord

TWV 35 – Individual pieces for harpsichord
Individual pieces for harpsichord (Einzelstücke)

TWV 36 – Collection of manuscripts
Collection of manuscripts (Sammelhandschrift)

TWV 37 – Lustiger Mischmasch
Lustiger Mischmasch

TWV 39 – Works for lute
Works for lute

==== Chamber music (TWV 40–45) ====
TWV 40 – Chamber music without basso continuo
Chamber music without basso continuo
- Sonata in D major for viola da gamba solo, TWV 40:1
- 12 Fantasias for Solo Flute, TWV 40:2–13
- 12 Fantasias for Solo Violin, TWV 40:14–25
- 12 Fantasias for Viola da Gamba, TWV 40:26–37
- Six Sonates sans basse, TWV 40:101–106
- Six Canonical Sonatas, TWV 40:118–123
- Second livre de duo pour deux violons, fluttes ou hautbois, TWV 40:124–129
- Sei Duetti per due Flauti, TWV 40:130–135
- Sonata for Two Violins, Viola and Violono, TWV 40:200
- Concertos for Four Violins, TWV 40:201–204

TWV 41 – Chamber music for 1 instrument with basso continuo
Chamber music for 1 instrument with basso continuo
- Methodical Sonatas

TWV 42 – Chamber music for 2 instruments with basso continuo
Chamber music for 2 instruments with basso continuo

TWV 43 – Chamber music for 3 instruments with basso continuo
Chamber music for 3 instruments with basso continuo
- Paris quartets

TWV 44 – Chamber music for 4 or more instruments with basso continuo
Chamber music for 4 or more instruments with basso continuo

TWV 45 – Polish dances from the Rostock manuscript

==== Music for orchestra (TWV 50–55) ====
TWV 50 – Symphonies, divertimenti, marches
Symphonies, divertimenti, marches

TWV 51 – Concertos for solo instrument and orchestra
Concertos for solo instrument and orchestra:
- Trumpet Concerto in D major, TWV 51:D7
- Violin Concerto in G minor, TWV 51:G1 (arranged by Bach for solo harpsichord as BWV 985)
- Oboe d'amore Concerto in G major, TWV 51:G3
- Viola Concerto in G major, TWV 51:G9

TWV 52 – Concertos for 2 instruments and orchestra
Concertos for 2 instruments and orchestra:
- Concerto for 2 violas in G major, TWV 52:G3

TWV 53 – Concertos for 3 instruments and orchestra
Concertos for 3 instruments and orchestra

TWV 54 – Concertos for 4 or more instruments and orchestra
Concertos for 4 or more instruments and orchestra

TWV 55 – Orchestral suites
Orchestral suites:
- Hamburger Ebb' und Fluth, TWV 55:C3 = Water Music (Telemann)
- Concert Suite in D major, TWV 55:D6
- Burlesque de Quixotte, TWV 55:G10

== See also ==
- List of vocal works by Georg Philipp Telemann (TVWV)
- List of instrumental works by Georg Philipp Telemann (TWV)
