= Ein feste Burg ist unser Gott (Telemann) =

Motet by Georg Philipp Telemann

- Motet by Georg Philipp Telemann
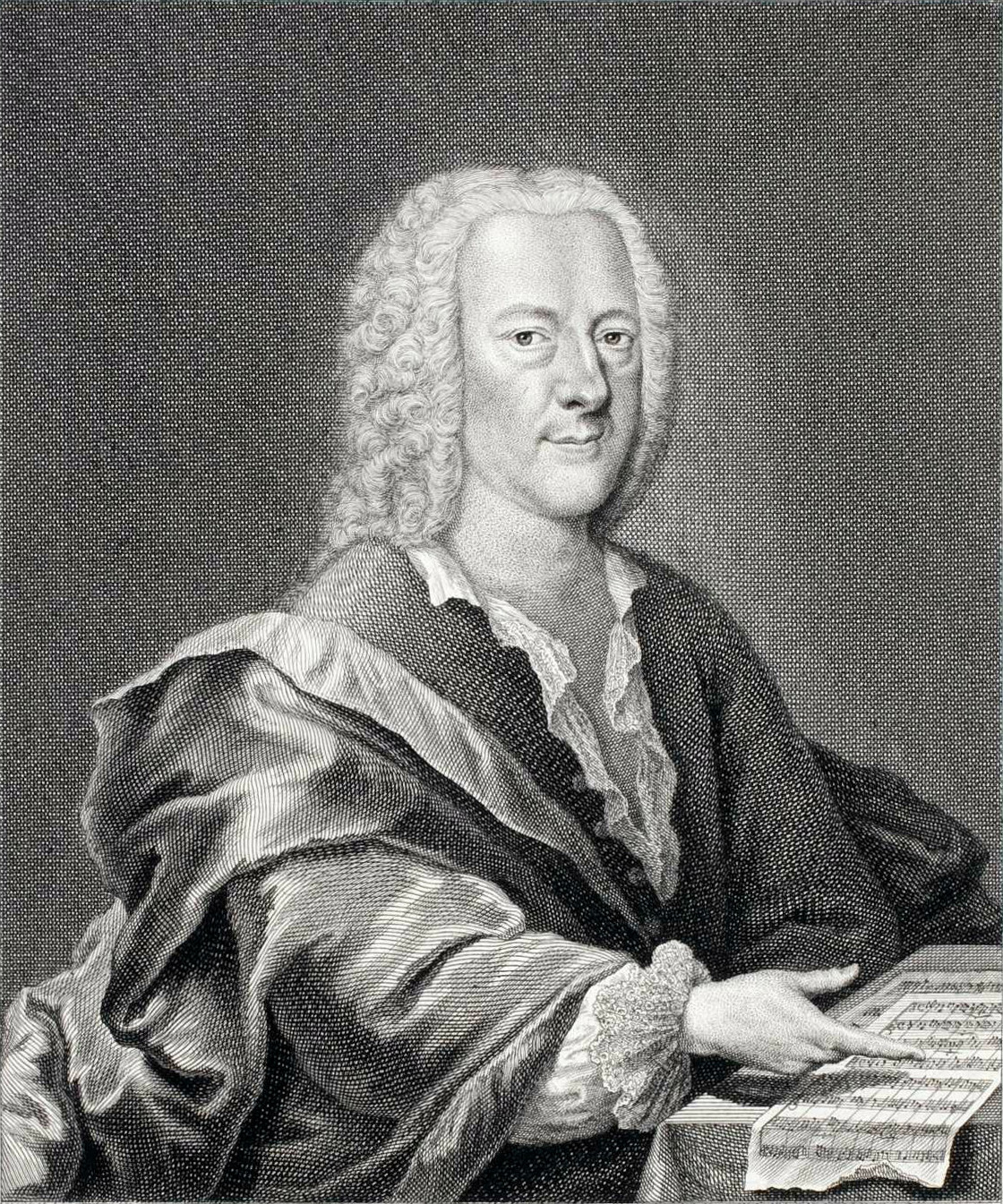
- Georg Philipp Telemann, depicted by Georg Lichtensteger, c. 1745
- Catalogue: TWV 8:7
- Composed: 1730
- Published: c. 1780: Hamburg

Georg Philipp Telemann composed the motet Ein feste Burg ist unser Gott, TWV 8:7, setting Luther's hymn in German, "Ein feste Burg ist unser Gott", for a four-part choir and continuo. The motet was first published around 1780. A modern edition was published by Carus-Verlag.

== History ==
Georg Philipp Telemann, in his capacity as church music director in Hamburg, organised a festival in the city in 1730 to celebrate the bicentenary of the Augsburg Confession. He contributed two cantatas, which were performed at the Katharinenkirche on 25 June, before and after the service. In the same year, he composed the motet Ein feste Burg ist unser Gott as a choral setting of Luther's hymn "Ein feste Burg ist unser Gott", known in English as "A Mighty Fortress Is Our God", for a four-part choir and continuo.

The motet was first published around 1780 in a collection of 34 motets. A modern edition was published by Carus-Verlag in 1978 and again in 1992, edited by Günter Graulich.

== Text and music ==
While Luther wrote the text in four stanzas as a paraphrase of Psalm 46, it became known as a Kampflied (battle song) of the Reformation. Telemann structured the work in two sections, the first covering the first two stanzas of Luther's hymn as a chorale fantasia. In the first stanza, the soprano performs has the cantus firmus, while the bass takes it in the second stanza. The last section sets the fourth and final stanza in homophony. Telemann set the work in F major and common time.

== Performance and recording ==
The motet was recorded in 1999 as pert of a collection of Telemann motets by the Magdeburger Kammerchor and the Magdeburger Barockorchester, conducted by Lothar Hennig.

2017 was both Telemann's 250th anniversary of birth and the quincentenary of the Reformation. The motet was performed then by Concerto Melante, members of the Berliner Philharmoniker and the Akademie für Alte Musik Berlin, in a concert of music of the Reformation which included settings of Luther's hymn also by Johann Walter and Franz Tunder. They recorded the motet the same year as a part of a collection named after it, which also contained other motets by Telemann, other settings of the hymn, and instrumental music by Telemann.
