= Kapitänsmusik =

Compositions by Georg Philipp Telemann

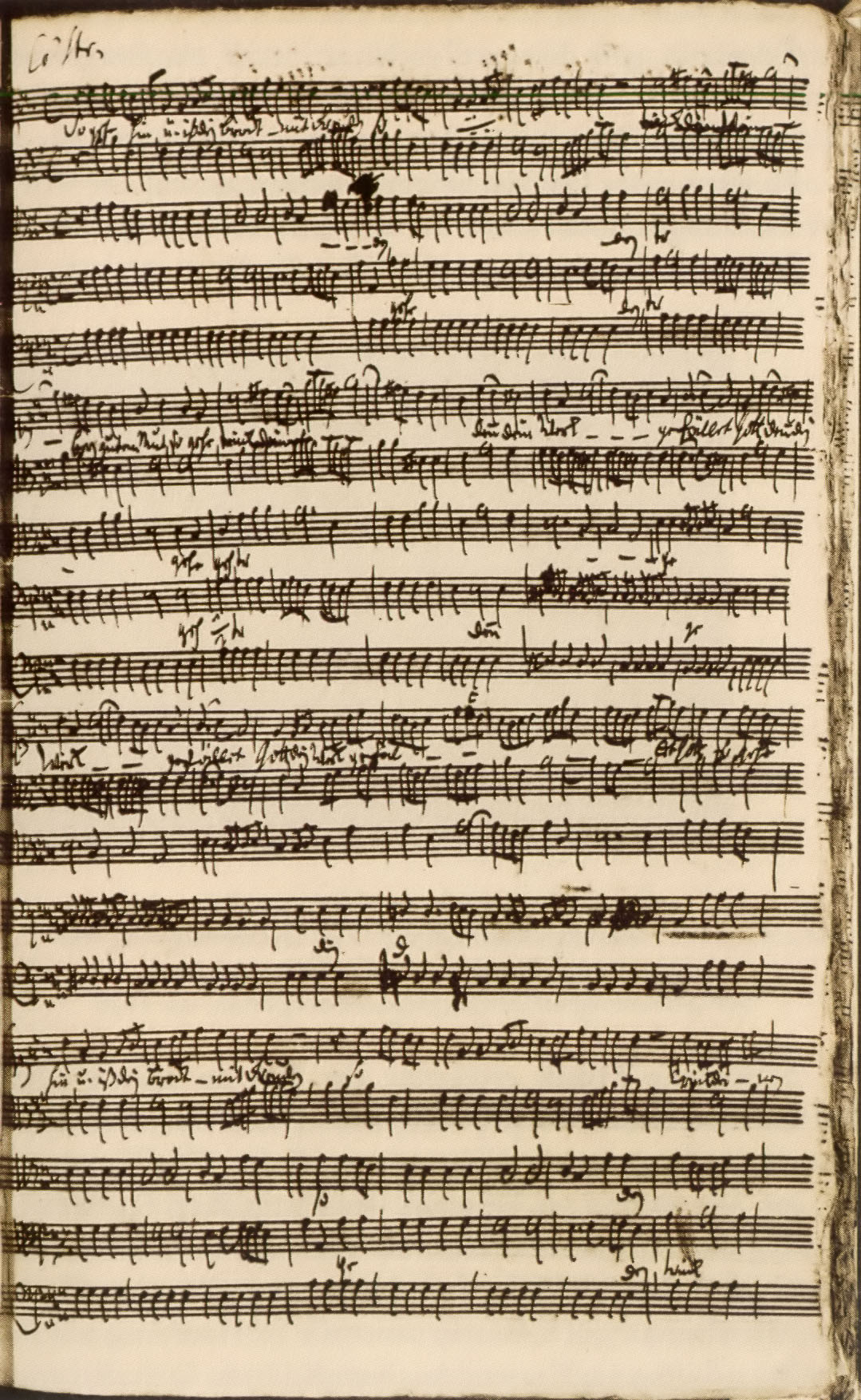
Manuscript score of So gehe hin und iß dein Brot mit Freuden (Kapitänsmusik oratorio, 1730)

The Hamburgische Kapitänsmusik (Hamburg Captain’s Music) refers to a body of compositions by Georg Philipp Telemann. They comprise sacred oratorios and secular serenades. However, the oratorios were intended to be performed in a secular setting, the Hamburg Drillhaus, and their characters are almost exclusively allegorical. The Kapitänsmusik was written for the annual banquet (or convivium) of the Hamburg militia captains.

The works span the period from 1723 to 1766, although many of the manuscripts have now been lost, and in several of those years no banquet was held. Although Telemann’s grandson Georg Michael Telemann inherited many autographs and manuscript copies of Telemann’s vocal works, the rest of his musical estate, including the Kapitänsmusik, was sold at an auction in Hamburg on September 6, 1769. Much of that material has since disappeared, and the auction catalogue has not survived. Of the 36 Kapitänsmusiken that Telemann wrote, only 10 oratorios (with nine complete oratorio–serenade pairs) plus a few separate pieces are extant today.

== Historical background ==
As a Reichsstand of the Holy Roman Empire Hamburg was affected by the Türkenkriege, wars against the expansion of the Ottoman Empire. Several Kapitänsmusiken thus feature patriotic sentiments both with regard to Hamburg and Germany.

In the Kapitänsmusik of 1738, the Kriegsgeist (Spirit of War) for example exalts the courage of the Germans at the beginning of the work: Ihr deutschen Söhne echter Art, die ihr euch nie der Trägheit aufgespart. Bekräftiget das Lob der unvergess'nen Taten. Die Enkel müssen noch der Ahnen Wert erraten. Later on, he evokes the spirit of Prince Eugene (Der Adler führt die Legionen, "The Eagle leads the legions to battle") and says:

Mein Schwert wird weit von euren Grenzen,
Wird bloß Byzanz zum Schrecken glänzen.
Dort kämpft mein Arm für Deutschlands Ruhm,
Dort will ich Habsburgs Eigentum
Der Sarazenen Hand entreißen
Und auch ihr Heiligtum in tausend Stücken schmeißen.

Translation:

My sword will only be drawn in regions far away
In order to frighten the Ottomans.
There, my arm will fight for Germany's glory,
There, I will wrest Habsburg's territories
From the hands of the Saracens,
Whose sanctuary will be destroyed at once.

In the last third of the work, Neid (Envy) sings an aria praising the downfall of Hamburg and Germany (Ja, es muss dein Fall erscheinen, "Yes, your downfall is nigh"), but is immediately contested by Chorus's reply: Schweig, wahnwitzvoller Neid. Umsonst, dass Deutschlands Glück dein höhn'scher Scherz betrübet. Schweig! Deutschland wird vom Himmel selbst geliebet. Auf, Helden, auf zum Streit! This recitative ends in the aria Ihr Deutschen auf, inciting the Germans to take arms against the enemies of the fatherland.

Finally, Chorus chants a paean about Germany's glory and the necessity of unity amongst all Germans: Deutschlands Ruhm soll ewig stehen. ("Germany's glory shall last forever.")

== Kapitänsmusik timeline ==
- 1723: Missing / Lost
- 1724: Oratorio + Serenata extant in Schwerin, Mecklenburgische Landesbibliothek Mus.ms. 5377/5 (Parts)
- 1725: Missing / Lost
- 1726: Missing / Lost
- 1727: Missing / Lost
- 1728: Only Oratorio: Berlin, SPK, Mus. ms. autogr. G. Ph. Telemann 28 (Score)
- 1729: Missing / Lost
- 1730: Oratorio + Serenata in SPK Mus. ms. autogr. G. Ph. Telemann 22 (Score)
- 1731: Missing / Lost
- 1732: Missing / Lost
- 1733: Missing / Lost
- 1734: Missing / Lost
- 1735: Missing / Lost
- 1736: Oratorio + Serenata in Schwerin Mus. ms. 5377/4 (Parts)
- 1737: Missing / Lost
- 1738: Oratorio + Serenata in Schwerin Mus. ms. 5377/3 (Parts)
- 1739: Missing / Lost
- 1740: Missing / Lost
- 1741: There was no Convivium
- 1742: Oratorio + Serenata in Schwerin Mus. ms. 5377/6 (Parts)
- 1743: Missing / Lost
- 1744: SPK Mus. ms. 21760 + 21761 (Parts), Mus. ms. autogr. G. Ph. Telemann 134 (autograph Violoncell-Part of O. + S.)
- 1745: There was no Convivium
- 1746: Missing / Lost
- 1747: Missing / Lost
- 1748: Missing / Lost
- 1749: Missing / Lost
- 1750: There was no Convivium (due to the burning down of St. Michaelis church)
- 1751: Missing / Lost
- 1752: Missing / Lost
- 1753: Missing / Lost
- 1754: Missing / Lost
- 1755: Oratorio + Serenata in SPK Mus. ms. autogr. G. Ph. Telemann 9 (Score)
- 1756: Only fragment of the oratorio in SPK Mus. ms. 21755 (Parts)
- 1757: There was no Convivium (due to the Seven-years-war)
- 1758: like 1757
- 1759: Missing / Lost
- 1760: Oratorio + Serenata in SPK Mus. ms. autogr. G. Ph. Telemann 23 (Score), autogr. 134 (Fragments of wind instr.); SPK 21743/45 + 21755/10 /Parts without wind instr.)
- 1761: Fragments of Oratorio in SPK 21755/14
- 1762: There was no Convivium
- 1763: There was no Convivium
- 1764: Oratorio in SPK 21755/18, Serenata in SPK 21755/19
- 1765: Missing / Lost
- 1766: There was no Convivium

== Literature ==
- Willi Maertens, Georg Philipp Telemanns sogenannte Hamburgische Kapitänsmusiken (1723-1765). Quellenkataloge zur Musikgeschichte 21. Wilhelmshaven, Florian Noetzel Verlag 1983. ISBN 3-7959-0520-6
- Heinz Becker and Lutz Lesle, 'Hamburg', The New Grove Dictionary of Music and Musicians, 2nd edition, Stanley Sadie and John Tyrell (editors), Oxford University Press, 2001.
