= Sonates sans basse (Telemann) =

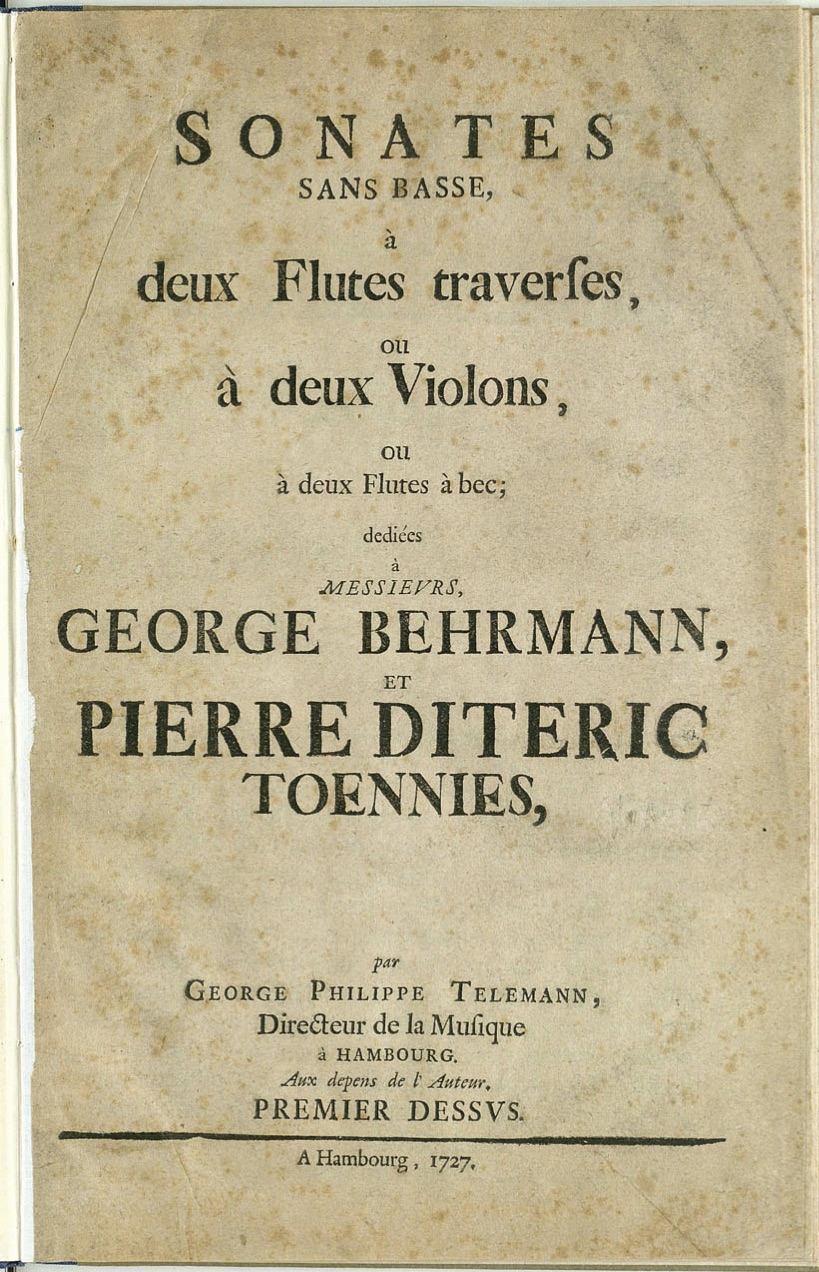
Title page of Telemann's 1727 publication (TWV 40:101-106)

The title of the original print of Georg Philipp Telemann's Sonates sans basse for two traversos, violins, or recorders (TWV 40:101–106), first published in Hamburg in 1727, reads: "Sonates sans basse à deux Flutes traverses, ou à deux Violons, ou à deux Flutes à bec." The collection was reprinted in Amsterdam (Le Cène, 1729), Paris (Le Clerc, 1736–37), and London (Walsh, 1746).

== Structure ==
The six sonatas consist of four movements each, and are catalogued in the following tonalities:

1. G major
2. D major
3. A major
4. E minor
5. B minor
6. E major

According to Steven D. Zohn,

The six duets all follow the same four-movement scheme in which a slow movement in variable style leads to a fugue, a slow movement in the Affettuoso mode, and a light finale that is usually dance based. Telemann goes to great lengths to ensure the equality of the two parts: neither is restricted to providing accompaniment to the other for more than a few measures at a time, and even sequential figuration tends to be divided between the parts though frequent voice exchange. Canonic writing, useful for involving both parts equally in the presentation of thematic material, is employed in many movements but never overused <…>.

== Reception ==
In 2008, Steven D. Zohn wrote,

Extraordinarily effective on a variety of instruments, these works are now undoubtedly the most widely played instrumental duets from the eighteenth century <...and are...> among the composer’s best-known music during his lifetime.
