= Das ist je gewißlich wahr =

Church cantata by Georg Philipp Telemann

Das ist je gewißlich wahr (This is now the gospel truth), TWV 1:183, is a cantata by Georg Philipp Telemann. Due to an erroneous attribution to Johann Sebastian Bach, it appears in the Bach-Werke-Verzeichnis (BWV) as No. 141, but was moved to Anhang III, the Appendix of spurious works, in the 1990s second edition of that catalogue.

The cantata's libretto by Johann Friedrich Helbig was published in 1720. Around 1723 Johann Balthasar König copied the manuscript, attributing its authorship to Telemann. Its spurious attribution to Bach can be found in some of the manuscript copies produced in the second half of the 18th century.

== History and text ==
The cantata was composed for Gaudete Sunday (third Sunday of Advent) in 1719 or 1720. The libretto is based on a reading of 1 Timothy 1:15 (opening chorus), and a text by Johann Friedrich Helbig (movements 2–4).

== Scoring and structure ==
This piece is scored for three vocal soloists (alto, tenor, and bass), a four-part choir, two oboes, two violins, viola, and basso continuo.

The cantata has four movements:

1. Chorus
2. Tenor aria
3. Alto recitative
4. Bass aria

== Reception ==
Accepting the attribution to Bach, the Bach Gesellschaft published the cantata as his work in the second half of the 19th century (BGA Vol. 30, pp. 1–16). The attribution to Bach was however doubted in the Bach-Jahrbuch of 1912. In 1920 Charles Sanford Terry opined the cantata to be "one of the least agreeable of Bach's works", and quoted some earlier not much more favourable comments by Bach-biographers Spitta, Schweitzer and Parry.

In the 1950 first edition of the BWV the cantata was assigned the number 141, but in subsequent editions of that catalogue, after Telemann's authorship had been established, the cantata was moved to the Appendix of spurious works. In the Telemann-Werke-Verzeichnis (TWV), the cantata was assigned the number 1:183. Some publishers continued to publish the score as a cantata by Bach. The New Bach Edition mentioned the cantata as Telemann's on p. 115 of the Critical commentary to Series I (Cantatas), Volume 41 (Varia) in 2000.

== Recordings ==
- Alsfelder Vokalensemble / I Febiarmionici. Apocryphal Bach Cantatas II. Radio Bremen, 2001.
