= Concertos for Four Violins (Telemann) =

Composition by Georg Philipp Telemann

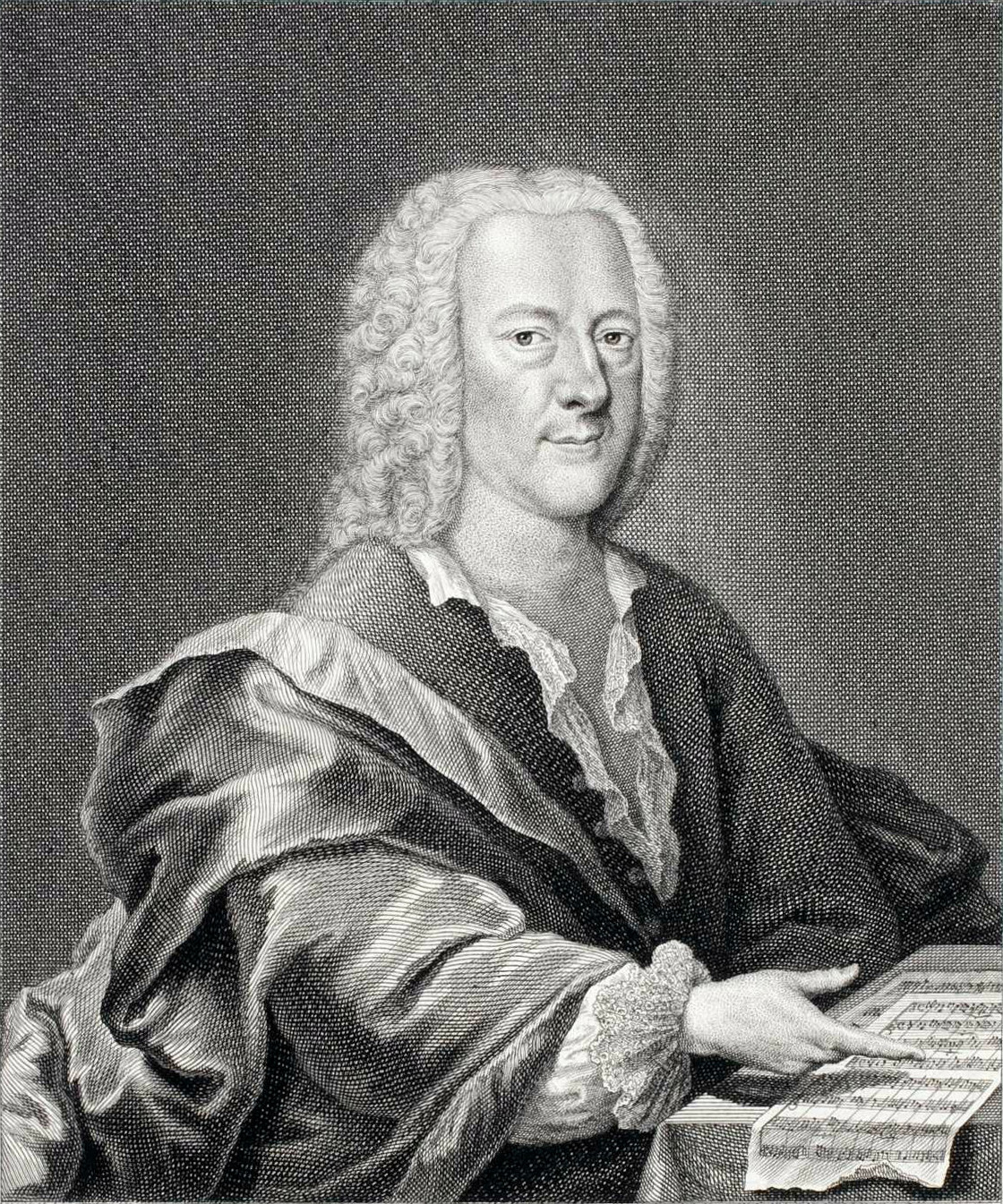
Georg Philipp Telemann c. 1745, engraving by Georg Lichtensteger

Georg Philipp Telemann's Concertos for Four Violins (TWV 40:201–204; original title: Concertos à 4 Violini Concertati) is a set of four concertos for four violins without continuo. Each concerto has four movements.

== Concertos ==
The four concertos are as follows.

=== Concerto in G major TWV 40:201 ===
The four movements are:

1. Largo e staccato
2. Allegro
3. Adagio
4. Vivace

=== Concerto in D major TWV 40:202 ===
The four movements are:

1. Adagio
2. Allegro 1
3. Grave
4. Allegro 2

=== Concerto in C major TWV 40:203 ===
The four movements are:

1. Grave
2. Allegro
3. Largo e staccato
4. Allegro

=== Concerto in A major TWV 40:204 ===
The four movements are:

1. Grave
2. Allegro
3. Adagio
4. Spirituoso
