= Siehe, es hat überwunden der Löwe =

Church cantata by Georg Philipp Telemann

Siehe, es hat überwunden der Löwe (Behold, the lion has triumphed), TWV 1:1328, BWV 219, is a church cantata by Georg Philipp Telemann, written for Michaelmas in 1723. Formerly the cantata was accredited to Johann Sebastian Bach.

== History and text ==
The cantata was performed in Hamburg in 1723 and again in 1728.

The text is by Erdmann Neumeister.

== Scoring and structure ==
The work is scored for soprano, alto and bass soloists, four-part choir, two trumpets, two violins, viola and basso continuo.

It has five movements:

1. Chorus: Siehe, es hat überwunden der Löwe
2. Aria (bass): Gott stürzt den Hochmut des wütenden Drachen
3. Recitative (soprano): Mensch, willt du nicht dein Heil verscherzen
4. Aria (alto): Wenn in meinen letzten Zügen Sünd' und Satan mich
5. Chorale: Lass deine Kirch' und unser Land

== Recording ==
- Alsfelder Vokalensemble / Steintor Barock Bremen, Wolfgang Helbich. The Apocryphal Bach Cantatas. CPO, 1991.
