= XIIX Canons mélodieux (Telemann) =

Canonic Sonata No. 4, TWV 40:121
(synthesizer)

Georg Philipp Telemann's XIIX Canons mélodieux ou VI. Sonates en Duo à Flutes Traverses, ou Violons, ou Basses de Viole (18 melodious canons or six duo-sonatas for traversos, or violins, or viola da gambas), TWV 40:118-123, is a set of 18 canons for two equal instruments, forming six sonatas in three movements each, which was published in 1738. These pieces have been arranged for flute and oboe, recorded by European Baroque Soloists on Denon, issued in 1991; catalogue number 81757 96142.
