= Ich weiß, daß mein Erlöser lebt, TWV 1:877 =

Church cantata

Ich weiß, daß mein Erlöser lebt (I know that my Redeemer lives), TWV 1:877, BWV 160, is a church cantata composed around 1725 by Georg Philipp Telemann for Easter Sunday, formerly attributed to Johann Sebastian Bach.

== History ==
A manuscript copy from the 18th century by Bach's student Heinrich Nikolaus Gerber identified Bach as the composer of the work, and on this basis it was published as Bach's in the 19th century, and given the number 160 in the Bach-Werke-Verzeichnis. Other 18th-century manuscripts attributed the work to Telemann: authenticated as a work by this composer the piece was assigned the number 1:877 in the Telemann-Werke-Verzeichnis. It is one of the works that Bach had copied out so that he could perform it as part of his employment in Leipzig.

== Structure ==
The piece is a solo cantata with lyrics by Erdmann Neumeister. It is scored for solo tenor voice, violin, bassoon, and basso continuo. It has five movements (all in the key of C major), alternating between arias and recitatives.

No.	Type	Text	Time
1	Aria	Ich weiß, daß mein Erlöser lebt	3/4
2	Recitative	Er lebt und ist von Todten auferstanden!	common time
3	Aria	Gott Lob, Gott Lob	common time
4	Recitative	So biet' ich allen Teufeln Trutz!	common time
5	Aria	Nun, ich halte mich bereit	common time

== Recordings ==
- Heidelberger Kammerorchester, Heinz Markus Göttsche. J.S. Bach: Cantatas BWV 55, BWV 160 & BWV 189. Oryx, 1968.
- Kammerorchester Carl Philipp Emanuel Bach, Peter Schreier. J.S. Bach: Solo-Kantaten und Arien. Philips, 1994.
- RIAS-Kammerorchester, Karl Ristenpart. The RIAS Bach Cantatas Project. Audite, 1950.
