= Gott der Hoffnung erfülle euch =

Church cantata by Georg Philipp Telemann

Gott der Hoffnung erfülle euch (May the God of hope fill you), TWV 1:634, BWV 218, is a church cantata by Georg Philipp Telemann formerly credited to Johann Sebastian Bach. It was composed for Whit Sunday in Eisenach in 1717, with text by Erdmann Neumeister. The closing chorale is the first stanza of Martin Luther's hymn for Pentecost "Komm, Gott Schöpfer, Heiliger Geist".

== Scoring and structure ==
The cantata is scored for soprano, alto, tenor, and bass soloists, a four-part choir, two horns, two violins, viola and basso continuo.

It has five movements:

1. Chorus: Gott der Hoffnung erfülle euch
2. Aria (alto): Glaub' und Hoffnung, Trost und Stärke
3. Recitative (soprano): Weil wir nichts ohne dich vermögen
4. Aria (soprano): Ihr Christen, wollt ihr selig sein
5. Chorale: Komm, Gott Schöpfer, Heiliger Geist

== Recording ==
- Alsfelder Vokalensemble / Steintor Barock Bremen, Wolfgang Helbich. The Apocryphal Bach Cantatas. CPO, 1991.
