= Admiralitätsmusik =

Musical composition by Georg Philipp Telemann

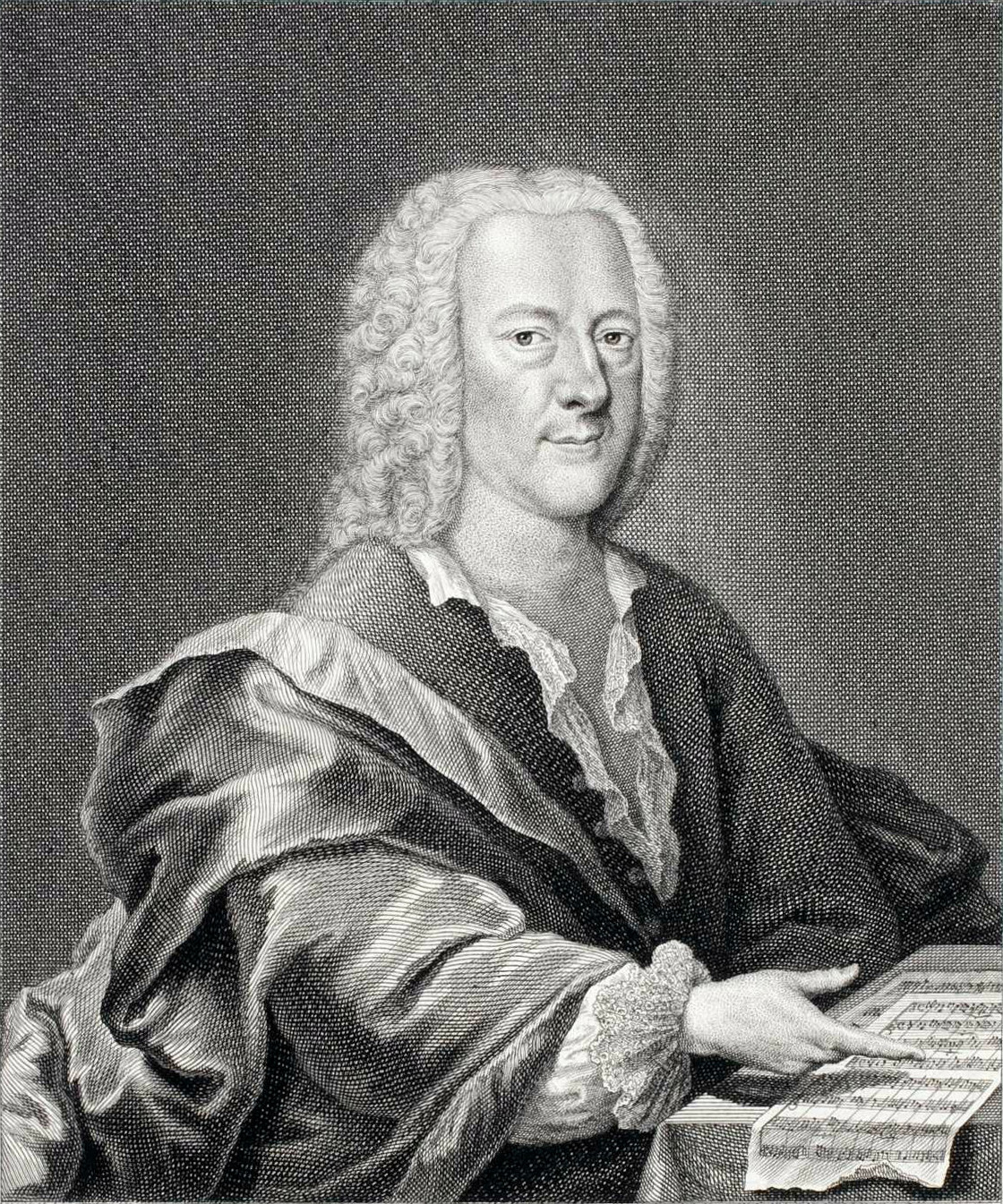
Georg Philipp Telemann, the composer of Hamburger Admiralitätsmusik.

Hamburger Admiralitätsmusik (Hamburg Admiralty Music) TWV 24:1 is a secular oratorio for soloists, choir and orchestra composed by Georg Philipp Telemann to celebrate the 100th anniversary of Hamburg's admiralty. It was first performed on April 6, 1723, along with Telemann's Wassermusik (Hamburger Ebb' und Fluth) at a banquet for the city's merchants, sea captains, and councillors that lasted until dawn. The work is on a nautical theme and set to verses by Michael Richey, a professor at the Johanneum school in Hamburg where Telemann also taught.

== Structure ==
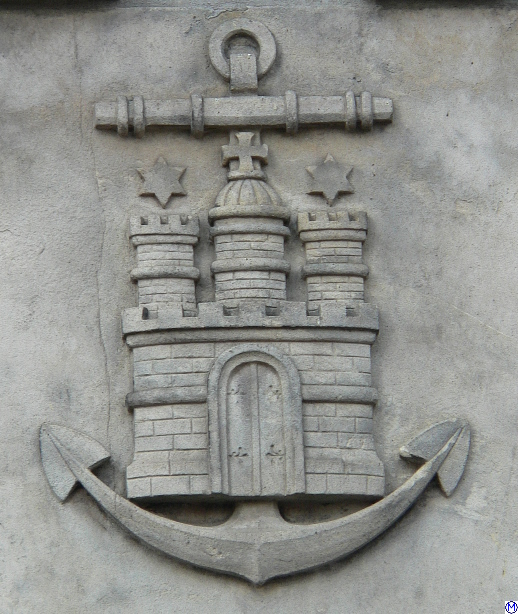
Emblem of the Hamburg Admiralty.

Overture in D major

Chorus	Unschätzbarer Vorwurf erkenntlicher Sinnen!
Recitative	So lange mir der Augen Licht erlaubt
Aria (Hammonia)	Ich nähre dich mit tausend Freuden
Recitative	Jawohl, glücksel'ge Stadt
Aria (Mercurius)	In der Börse gepresstem Getummel
Recitative	Berühme dich, Mercur, der Ruhe nicht
Aria (Themis)	Die Freiheit schmeichelt zwar
Recitative	Unleugbar ist dein Ruhm
Aria (Mars)	Frecher Harpyien
Recitative	Ich höre ...
Aria-Round Song	Glück zu
Recitative	Mit was für unverrhofften Chören
Aria (Hammonia)	Mit euch, ihr holden beiden
Recitative	Der Elbe dienstbefliss'ne Wellen
Aria (Neptunus)	Dein Wohlergehn, o Schönste
Recitative	Und ich, o meines Ufers Königin
Aria (Albis)	Schwelt, ihr wasserreichen Grunde
Recitative	Schau, mächtiger Neptun
Aria-Duet (Hammonia/Albis)	Erwähle, mit gewog'ner Hand
Recitative	Welch angenehmer Aufenthalt
Chorus of The Nymphs And Tritons	Sage, schönster Nymphenchor
Recitative	Mein Glück ist ungemein
Aria (Mercurius)	Wann Himmel und Erde veralten
Recitative	Mit innigstem Ergötzen
Aria (Albis)	Steh aller Welt zum Wunder da
Recitative	Wünscht jedermann dem werten Hamburg
Aria (Neptunus)	Gewogener Sternen erfreuliche Schlüsse
Recitative and Chorus	Ihr Götter
Aria (Albis)	Ihr munteren Hörner
Recitative	So recht!
Concluding Chorus	Hamburg, du Ehre

== Scoring ==
The Hamburger Admiralitätsmusik was composed for: 6 soloists SATBBB, 2 piccolos, recorder, 2 flutes, 2 oboes, oboe d'amore, 2 bassoons, 3 trumpets, 3 horns, drums, 2 violins, viola, cellos and basso continuo.

Roles: Hammonia (S), Themis (A), Mercurius (T), Neptunus (B), Mars (B), Albis (B)

== Recording ==
- Telemann: Hamburger Admiralitätsmusik; Overture in C (Mieke van der Sluis (soprano), Graham Pushee, Rufus Müller (tenor), Klaus Mertens, David Thomas, Michael Schopper (bass); Alsfelder Vokalensemble, Bremen Baroque Orchestra; conductor: Wolfgang Helbich). cpo 999 373-2.
