= Viola Concerto in G major (Telemann) =

Viola Concerto by Georg Philipp Telemann

Viola Concerto
I. Largo

II. Allegro

III. Andante

IV. Presto
Performed by the Advent Chamber Orchestra with Elias Goldstein (viola)

Of Georg Philipp Telemann's surviving concertos, his Viola Concerto in G major, TWV 51:G9 is among his most famous, and still regularly performed today. It is the first known concerto for viola and was written circa 1716–21. Telemann focused on composing for lesser-known instruments, resulting in the composition of this Viola Concerto.

Telemann's Concerto for Viola represents a major Baroque concerto, as he explored the soloistic sound of the instrument, allowing it to be viewed as more than just an ensemble instrument. Unlike J.S. Bach and Vivaldi's standard concerti of three movements, Telemann's Concerto in G major for Viola contains four movements, and follows sonata da chiesa form, alternating between the tutti and solo sections, a common practice during this period.

The four movements are:

1. Largo: A mellow movement with long notes. Written in 3/2, with many dotted quarter and eighth note slurs, and is in the key of G. Usually is played with vibrato. Some performers choose to add significant ornamentation to this very simple movement.
2. Allegro: Most played movement. Written in 4/4 and in the key of G. The melody begins with a distinctive syncopated figure which is also used independently later in the movement.
3. Andante: A slow, mellow movement in the relative minor and largely on the upper strings of the instrument. This movement is in E minor, the relative minor of G major.
4. Presto: A fast, exciting movement in the tonic key.

The fast movements contain very few slurs, and many performers' editions include slurring suggestions, often indistinguishable from markings contained in the original. The performer is encouraged to invent a varied pattern of slurs which fits the shape of each phrase.

The slow movements both give the option of a cadenza.

A typical performance lasts about 14 minutes.
