= Water Music (Telemann) =

Orchestral suite 1723 by Telemann

Excerpt from the movement Der stürmende Aeolus

Water Music (Wassermusik), TWV 55:C3, is the common name of an orchestral suite by the German Baroque composer Georg Philipp Telemann, with the full title Hamburger Ebb' und Fluth (Hamburg ebb and flood).

Telemann composed the piece in ten movements to celebrate the centennial anniversary of the Hamburg Admiralty in a performance on 6 April 1723. The suite draws upon Hamburg's geographical location as an important and successful port on the river Elbe while Telemann illustrates the piece with mythological water deities and tone painting giving the nautical theme added depth. The overture begins by representing the physical movement of the ocean, followed by several dance movements: first, the sleeping sea goddess Thetis, the mother of Achilles, who then awakes; the sea god Neptune in love; playful water nymphs known as Naiads; Neptune's son and sea messenger Triton joking; Aeolus, ruler of the winds; and Zephir, god of the west wind. Two final pieces follow, one depicting the tides of Hamburg and finally, its happy sailors.

== Movements ==
The ten movements are:

1. Ouverture in C major
2. Sarabande: Die schlafende Thetis (The sleeping Thetis)
3. Bourrée: Die erwachende Thetis (Thetis awakening)
4. Loure: Der verliebte Neptunus (Neptune in love)
5. Gavotte: Spielende Najaden (Playing Naiads)
6. Harlequinade: Der schertzende Tritonus (The joking Triton)
7. Tempête: Der stürmende Aeolus (The stormy Aeolus)
8. Menuett: Der angenehme Zephir (The pleasant Zephir)
9. Gigue: Ebbe und Fluth (Ebb and Flow)
10. Canarie: Die lustigen Boots Leute (The merry Boat People)
