= List of vocal works by Georg Philipp Telemann (TVWV) =

This is a list of all vocal works by Georg Philipp Telemann in the Telemann-Vokalwerke-Verzeichnis (Telemann Vocal Works Catalogue), abbreviated TVWV, as catalogued by Werner Menke.

The following tables contain Telemann's works as listed in the Telemann Portal and the Catalogue TWV.

Works not yet listed in TVWV have not been included.

== Tables ==
=== TVWV 1 – Church cantatas ===
Section	Catalogue	Title	Occasion	Scoring	Observation	URL
TVWV 1	TVWV 1:1	Abscheuliche Tiefe des großen Verderbens	Sunday after Christmas	SATB with 2 flutes, 2 violins, viola, cello and continuo	—	Telemann Portal; Catalogue TWV
TVWV 1	TVWV 1:1a	Abscheuliche Tiefe des großen Verderbens	Feast of the Assumption of Mary	Solo voice with violin, viola and continuo	Version	Catalogue TWV
TVWV 1	TVWV 1:2	Ach, ach, mein Jesus geht von mir	4th Sunday after Easter	—	Lost	Telemann Portal; Catalogue TWV
TVWV 1	TVWV 1:3	Ach bleib mit deinem Worte	2nd day of Easter	—	—	Telemann Portal; Catalogue TWV
TVWV 1	TVWV 1:4	Ach, dass der Herr aus Zion käme	1st Sunday after Advent	SATB with 2 oboes, 2 violins, viola, cello and continuo	—	Telemann Portal; Catalogue TWV
TVWV 1	TVWV 1:5	Ach, dass der Herr aus Zion käme	2nd day of the Christmas festival	SATB with horn, 2 violins, viola and continuo	—	Telemann Portal; Catalogue TWV
TVWV 1	TVWV 1:6	Ach, dass die Hilfe aus Zion käme	2nd day of the Christmas festival	—	—	Telemann Portal; Catalogue TWV
TVWV 1	TVWV 1:7	Ach, dass du den Himmel zerrissest	Christmas Feast	SATB with 3 trumpets, timpani, 2 violins, viola, cello and continuo	—	Telemann Portal; Catalogue TWV
TVWV 1	TVWV 1:8	Ach, dass ich dich, mein Jesu	20th Sunday after Trinity	—	Lost	Telemann Portal; Catalogue TWV
TVWV 1	TVWV 1:9	Ach, ewiges Wort in Herz und Munde	3rd day of Christmas	Solo voice with violin, viola and continuo	—	Telemann Portal; Catalogue TWV
TVWV 1	TVWV 1:10	Ach Gott, dein Zion klagt und weint	17th Sunday after Trinity	Solo tenor and SATB with 2 violins and continuo	—	Telemann Portal; Catalogue TWV
TVWV 1	TVWV 1:11	Ach Gott, du bist gerecht	22nd Sunday after Trinity	SATB with 2 violins, viola, cello and continuo	—	Telemann Portal; Catalogue TWV
TVWV 1	TVWV 1:12	Ach Gott, es geht gar übel zu	8th Sunday after Trinity	Solo viola and SATB with 2 violins, viola and continuo	—	Telemann Portal; Catalogue TWV
TVWV 1	TVWV 1:13	Ach Gott, es wird ja diese Zeit	27th Sunday after Trinity	—	Lost	Telemann Portal; Catalogue TWV
TVWV 1	TVWV 1:14	Ach Gott, vom Himmel sieh darein	10th Sunday after Trinity	Solo bass and SATB with 2 violins, viola, cello and continuo	—	Telemann Portal; Catalogue TWV
TVWV 1	TVWV 1:15	Ach Gott, wenn mir das kommen ein	3rd Sunday after Trinity	—	Lost	Telemann Portal; Catalogue TWV
TVWV 1	TVWV 1:15a	Ach Gott, wie beugt der Eltern Herze	21st Sunday after Trinity	Solo soprano with flute, violin and continuo	Version	Catalogue TWV
TVWV 1	TVWV 1:16	Ach Gott, wie drückt die Last der Sünden	19th Sunday after Trinity	SATB with 2 oboes, 2 violins, viola, cello and continuo	—	Telemann Portal; Catalogue TWV
TVWV 1	TVWV 1:17	Ach Gott, wie elend wären wir	4th Sunday of Advent	—	Lost	Telemann Portal; Catalogue TWV
TVWV 1	TVWV 1:18	Ach Gott, wie manches Herzeleid	3rd Sunday of Advent	SATB with 2 oboes, 2 violins, viola and continuo	—	Telemann Portal; Catalogue TWV
TVWV 1	TVWV 1:19	Ach Gott, wie manches Herzeleid	3rd Sunday after Easter	SATB with 2 flutes, 2 oboes, 2 violins, 2 violas and continuo	—	Telemann Portal; Catalogue TWV
TVWV 1	TVWV 1:20	Ach Gott, wie manches Herzeleid	2nd day of the Christmas festival	SATB with 2 oboes, 2 violins, viola, cello and continuo	—	Telemann Portal; Catalogue TWV
TVWV 1	TVWV 1:21	Ach Gott, wie manches Herzeleid	Sunday after Ascension Day	Solo bass and SATB with 2 violins, viola, cello and continuo	—	Telemann Portal; Catalogue TWV
TVWV 1	TVWV 1:22	Ach, groß sind unsre Sünden	10th Sunday after Trinity	—	Lost	Telemann Portal; Catalogue TWV
TVWV 1	TVWV 1:23	Ach Herr, du Schöpfer aller Dinge	2nd day of the Christmas festival	—	Lost	Telemann Portal; Catalogue TWV
TVWV 1	TVWV 1:24	Ach Herr, lehr uns bedenken wohl	16th Sunday after Trinity	Solo bass and SATB with 2 oboes, viola and continuo	—	Telemann Portal; Catalogue TWV
TVWV 1	TVWV 1:25	Ach Herr, mich armen Sünder	3rd Sunday after Trinity	—	Lost	Telemann Portal; Catalogue TWV
TVWV 1	TVWV 1:26	Ach Herr, wie ist meiner Feinde so viel	Sunday After New Year's Eve	SATB with 2 oboes, 2 violins, viola, cello and continuo	—	Telemann Portal; Catalogue TWV
TVWV 1	TVWV 1:27	Ach Herr, wie sind meiner Feinde so viel	Sunday After New Year's Eve	SATB with 2 oboes, 2 violins, viola, cello and continuo	—	Telemann Portal; Catalogue TWV
TVWV 1	TVWV 1:27a	Ach, indem ich dich erblicke	Ascension Day	Solo voice with violin, viola and continuo	Version	Catalogue TWV
TVWV 1	TVWV 1:28	Ach, Jesus geht zu seiner Pein	Sunday of Quinquagesima	SATB with 2 flutes, 2 oboes, 2 violins, viola, cello and continuo	—	Telemann Portal; Catalogue TWV
TVWV 1	TVWV 1:29	Ach, mein Herze schwimmt im Blute	11th Sunday after Trinity	SATB with 2 oboes, 2 violins, viola, cello and continuo	—	Telemann Portal; Catalogue TWV
TVWV 1	TVWV 1:29a	Ach, mein herzlieben Jesulein	Christmas Feast	—	Extracted Air	Catalogue TWV
TVWV 1	TVWV 1:30	Ach Not, wenn Gottes Hand	25th Sunday after Trinity	Solo soprano with violin, viola and continuo	—	Telemann Portal; Catalogue TWV
TVWV 1	TVWV 1:30a	Ach reiner Geist, dein gnädig	Feast of Pentecost	—	—	Catalogue TWV
TVWV 1	TVWV 1:31	Ach, sagt mir nichts von Gold und Schätzen	15th Sunday after Trinity	—	—	Telemann Portal; Catalogue TWV
TVWV 1	TVWV 1:31a	Ach Seele, hungre, dürste	2nd Sunday after Trinity	Soprano with 2 recorders and continuo	Version	Catalogue TWV
TVWV 1	TVWV 1:32	Ach, sollte doch die ganze Welt	18th Sunday after Trinity	SATB with 2 oboes, 2 violins, viola and continuo	—	Telemann Portal; Catalogue TWV
TVWV 1	TVWV 1:33	Ach süsse Ruh, die stets mein Geist	22nd Sunday after Trinity	SATB with 2 oboes, 2 violins, viola, cello and continuo	—	Telemann Portal; Catalogue TWV
TVWV 1	TVWV 1:34	Ach, welche Bitterkeit der Schmerzen	16th Sunday after Trinity	SATB with 2 oboes, 2 violins, viola, cello and continuo	—	Telemann Portal; Catalogue TWV
TVWV 1	TVWV 1:35	Ach, wer verkündigt mir, was mir ins zukünftige	Miscellaneous cantatas	—	—	Telemann Portal; Catalogue TWV
TVWV 1	TVWV 1:36	Ach, wie beißt mich mein Gewissen	11th Sunday after Trinity	SATB with 2 transverse flutes, 2 oboes, 2 violins, viola and continuo	—	Telemann Portal; Catalogue TWV
TVWV 1	TVWV 1:37	Ach wie nichtig, ach wie flüchtig	25th Sunday after Trinity	SATB with 2 oboes/2 flutes, 2 violins, viola, cello and continuo	—	Telemann Portal; Catalogue TWV
TVWV 1	TVWV 1:38	Ach wie nichtig, ach wie flüchtig	24th Sunday after Trinity	—	—	Telemann Portal; Catalogue TWV
TVWV 1	TVWV 1:39	Ach, wie so gut ist hier zu sein	6th Sunday after Epiphany	SATTBBB with oboe d'amore, 2 violins, viola, cello and continuo	—	Telemann Portal; Catalogue TWV
TVWV 1	TVWV 1:40	Ach, wie so lang, ach Herr	2nd Sunday after Epiphany	SATB with 2 oboes, 2 violins, viola, cello and continuo	—	Telemann Portal; Catalogue TWV
TVWV 1	TVWV 1:41	Ach, wo bin ich hingeraten	3rd Sunday after Trinity	Solo tenor with oboe, 2 violins, cello and continuo	—	Telemann Portal; Catalogue TWV
TVWV 1	TVWV 1:42	Ach, wo bin ich hingeraten	Miscellaneous cantatas	SATB with 2 flutes, bassoon, 2 violins, viola, viola da gamba and continuo	—	Telemann Portal; Catalogue TWV
TVWV 1	TVWV 1:43	Ach, wo flieh ich Armer hin	3rd Sunday after Trinity	SATB with 2 oboes, 2 violins, viola, cello and continuo	—	Telemann Portal; Catalogue TWV
TVWV 1	TVWV 1:44	Ach, wo ist mein Jesus hin	1st Sunday after Epiphany	SATB with 2 oboes, 2 violins, viola, cello and continuo	—	Telemann Portal; Catalogue TWV
TVWV 1	TVWV 1:45	Ach, wo kömmt doch das böse Ding her	23rd Sunday after Trinity	SAB with 2 violins, viola and continuo	—	Telemann Portal; Catalogue TWV
TVWV 1	TVWV 1:46	Ach, wundergroßer Siegesheld	Ascension Day	—	Lost	Telemann Portal; Catalogue TWV
TVWV 1	TVWV 1:47	Ach, wundergroßer Siegesheld	Ascension Day	SATB with oboe, 2 bugles, timpani, 2 violins, viola, cello and continuo	—	Telemann Portal; Catalogue TWV
TVWV 1	TVWV 1:47a	Ach Zion, lass den Fall	10th Sunday after Trinity	Solo voice with violin, viola and continuo	Version	Catalogue TWV
TVWV 1	TVWV 1:48	Ach, zu den tiefsten Jammerhöhlen	Sunday after Ascension Day	SATB with 2 oboes, 2 violins, viola, cello and continuo	—	Telemann Portal; Catalogue TWV
TVWV 1	TVWV 1:49	Alle, die gottselig leben wollen	Sunday After New Year's Eve	SATB with 2 oboes, 2 violins, viola, cello and continuo	—	Telemann Portal; Catalogue TWV
TVWV 1	TVWV 1:50	Alle, die gottselig leben wollen	Sunday after Christmas	SATB with 2 oboes, viola, cello and continuo	—	Telemann Portal; Catalogue TWV
TVWV 1	TVWV 1:51	Alle, die gottselig leben wollen	Sunday after Ascension Day	SATB with flute, 2 oboes, 2 horns, 2 violins, 2 violas and continuo	—	Telemann Portal; Catalogue TWV
TVWV 1	TVWV 1:52	Alle, die gottselig leben wollen	3rd Sunday after Easter	SATB with 2 oboes, 3 bugles, timpani, 2 violins, viola, cello and continuo	—	Telemann Portal; Catalogue TWV
TVWV 1	TVWV 1:53	Alle, die gottselig leben wollen	3rd Sunday after Easter	—	Lost	Telemann Portal; Catalogue TWV
TVWV 1	TVWV 1:54	Alle, die gottselig leben wollen	Sunday After New Year's Eve	SATB with 2 violins, viola, cello and continuo	—	Telemann Portal; Catalogue TWV
TVWV 1	TVWV 1:55	Alle gute Gabe[n] und alle vollkommene[n] Gabe[n]	4th Sunday after Easter	SATB with 2 oboes, 2 violins, viola, cello and continuo	—	Telemann Portal; Catalogue TWV
TVWV 1	TVWV 1:56	Allein dein Wort, Herr Jesu Christ	Sunday of Sexagesima	—	Lost	Telemann Portal; Catalogue TWV
TVWV 1	TVWV 1:57	Allein die Anfechtung lehret	3rd Sunday after Easter	SATB with 2 oboes, 2 violins, viola, cello and continuo	—	Telemann Portal; Catalogue TWV
TVWV 1	TVWV 1:58	Allein Gott in der Höh sei Ehr	Christmas Feast	Solo bass and SATB with bugle, 2 violins, viola and continuo	—	Telemann Portal; Catalogue TWV
TVWV 1	TVWV 1:59	Allein Gott in der Höh sei Ehr	Choral cantata	SBB with 2 violins, viola and continuo	—	Telemann Portal; Catalogue TWV
TVWV 1	TVWV 1:60	Allein zu dir, Herr Jesu Christ	Feast of the Assumption of Mary	SATB with 2 oboes, 2 bassoons, 2 trumpets, timpani, 2 violins, viola, cello and continuo	—	Telemann Portal; Catalogue TWV
TVWV 1	TVWV 1:61	Allein zu dir, Herr Jesu Christ	19th Sunday after Trinity	—	Lost	Telemann Portal; Catalogue TWV
TVWV 1	TVWV 1:62	Allein zu dir, Herr Jesu Christ	2nd Sunday of Lent	SATBB with oboe/oboe d'amore, 2 violins, viola and continuo	—	Telemann Portal; Catalogue TWV
TVWV 1	TVWV 1:63	Alleluja, Herr Gott, dich loben wir	1st Sunday after Advent	SATB with 2 oboes, 2 bugles, timpani, 2 violins, viola, cello and continuo	—	Telemann Portal; Catalogue TWV
TVWV 1	TVWV 1:64	Allenthalben ist dies Leben	14th Sunday after Trinity	Bass solo and SATB with 2 violins, viola and continuo	—	Telemann Portal; Catalogue TWV
TVWV 1	TVWV 1:65	Aller Augen warten auf dich	4th Sunday of Lent	SATB with 2 oboes, 2 violins, viola, cello and continuo	—	Telemann Portal; Catalogue TWV
TVWV 1	TVWV 1:66	Aller Augen warten auf dich	7th Sunday after Trinity	SATB with 2 oboes, bassoon, 2 violins, viola, cello and continuo	—	Telemann Portal; Catalogue TWV
TVWV 1	TVWV 1:67	Aller Augen warten auf dich	15th Sunday after Trinity	SATB with 2 oboes, 2 violins, viola, cello and continuo	—	Telemann Portal; Catalogue TWV
TVWV 1	TVWV 1:68	Alles Fleisch ist Heu	16th Sunday after Trinity	SATB with 2 oboes, 2 violins, viola, cello and continuo	—	Telemann Portal; Catalogue TWV
TVWV 1	TVWV 1:68a	Alles sei dir unverhohlen	4th Sunday of Lent	SATB with 2 oboes, 2 violins, viola, cello and continuo	Version	Catalogue TWV
TVWV 1	TVWV 1:69	Alles, was ihr tut	New Year	SATB with flute, 2 trumpets, timpani, 2 violins, viola, cello and continuo	—	Telemann Portal; Catalogue TWV
TVWV 1	TVWV 1:70	Alles, was von Gott geboren ist	Feast of the Holy Trinity	SATB with 2 oboes, 3 bugles, timpani, 2 violins, viola, cello and continuo	—	Telemann Portal; Catalogue TWV
TVWV 1	TVWV 1:71	Alle eure Sorgen werfet auf den Herrn	15th Sunday after Trinity	SATB with 2 oboes, 2 violins, viola, cello and continuo	—	Telemann Portal; Catalogue TWV
TVWV 1	TVWV 1:72	Allmächtiger, heiliger, starker Gott	1st Sunday of Lent	SSAATBB with 2 flutes, 2 oboes, 2 violins, viola and continuo	—	Telemann Portal; Catalogue TWV
TVWV 1	TVWV 1:73	All's Glück und Ungelücke	12th Sunday after Trinity	Solo bass and SATB with oboe, 2 violins, viola and continuo	—	Telemann Portal; Catalogue TWV
TVWV 1	TVWV 1:74	Also hat Gott die Welt geliebet	2nd day of the feast of Pentecost	SATB with flute, 2 oboes, 2 violins, viola, cello and continuo	—	Telemann Portal; Catalogue TWV
TVWV 1	TVWV 1:75	Also hat Gott die Welt geliebet	2nd day of the feast of Pentecost	SATB with 2 oboes, bassoon, 2 violins, viola, cello and continuo	—	Telemann Portal; Catalogue TWV
TVWV 1	TVWV 1:76	Also hat Gott die Welt geliebet	2nd day of the feast of Pentecost	SATB with 2 oboes, 2 violins, viola, cello and continuo	—	Telemann Portal; Catalogue TWV
TVWV 1	TVWV 1:77	Also hat Gott die Welt geliebt	2nd day of the feast of Pentecost	SATB with 2 oboes, 3 bugles, timpani, 2 violins, viola, cello and continuo	—	Telemann Portal; Catalogue TWV
TVWV 1	TVWV 1:78	Also hat Gott die Welt geliebet	3rd day of the feast of Pentecost	—	Lost	Telemann Portal; Catalogue TWV
TVWV 1	TVWV 1:79	Also hat Gott die Welt geliebet	3rd day of Christmas	—	Lost	Telemann Portal; Catalogue TWV
TVWV 1	TVWV 1:80	Also hat Gott die Welt geliebet	2nd day of the feast of Pentecost	SATB with 2 bugles, timpani, 2 violins, viola, cello and continuo	—	Telemann Portal; Catalogue TWV
TVWV 1	TVWV 1:81	Also hat Gott die Welt	2nd day of the feast of Pentecost	—	Lost	Telemann Portal; Catalogue TWV
TVWV 1	TVWV 1:81a	Also hat Gott die Welt geliebet	2nd day of the feast of Pentecost	Solo voice with 2 oboes and continuo	Version	Catalogue TWV
TVWV 1	TVWV 1:82	Also hat Gott die Welt geliebet	2nd day of the feast of Pentecost	SAB with 2 violins, viola and continuo	—	Telemann Portal; Catalogue TWV
TVWV 1	TVWV 1:83	Also hat Gott die Welt geliebet, das merke	Feast of Pentecost	—	Lost	Telemann Portal; Catalogue TWV
TVWV 1	TVWV 1:84	Also hat Gott die Welt geliebet, das merke	2nd day of the feast of Pentecost	—	Lost	Telemann Portal; Catalogue TWV
TVWV 1	TVWV 1:85	Also hat Gott die Welt geliebet	2nd day of the feast of Pentecost	SSATB with 2 sizes, 2 violins, viola, cello and continuo	—	Telemann Portal; Catalogue TWV
TVWV 1	TVWV 1:86	Also hat Gott die Welt geliebet	2nd day of the feast of Pentecost	SATB with 3 bugles, timpani, 2 violins, viola, cello and continuo	—	Telemann Portal; Catalogue TWV
TVWV 1	TVWV 1:87	Also hoch und also sehr	2nd day of the feast of Pentecost	Solo and SATB soprano with 2 violins and continuo	—	Telemann Portal; Catalogue TWV
TVWV 1	TVWV 1:88	Also ist geschrieben	3rd day of Easter	—	Lost	Telemann Portal; Catalogue TWV
TVWV 1	TVWV 1:89	Also schweig, mein Mund, verstummet...	2nd day of the feast of Pentecost	SATB with 2 horns, 2 violins, 2 violas and continuo	—	Telemann Portal; Catalogue TWV
TVWV 1	TVWV 1:90	Also wird auch sein die Zukunft	1st Sunday after Advent	SATB with 2 violins, viola, cello and continuo	Lost	Telemann Portal; Catalogue TWV
TVWV 1	TVWV 1:90a	Alter Adam, du musst sterben	Feast of the Holy Trinity	Solo vocals with violo, viola and continuo	Version	Catalogue TWV
TVWV 1	TVWV 1:91	Amen! Lob und Ehre	Sunday after Christmas	SAB with 2 violins, viola and continuo	—	Telemann Portal; Catalogue TWV
TVWV 1	TVWV 1:92	Amen, amen, Lob und Ehre	Sunday after Christmas	SATB with 2 oboes, 2 violins, viola, cello and continuo	—	Telemann Portal; Catalogue TWV
TVWV 1	TVWV 1:93	Am göttlichen Segen ist alles gelegen	7th Sunday after Trinity	SATB with 2 flutes, 2 oboes, 2 violins, viola, cello and continuo	—	Telemann Portal; Catalogue TWV
TVWV 1	TVWV 1:94	Am guten Tag sei guter Dinge	2nd Sunday of Lent	SATB with 2 oboes, 2 violins, viola, cello and continuo	—	Telemann Portal; Catalogue TWV
TVWV 1	TVWV 1:95	An Jesu kann ich mich	2nd Sunday after Easter	—	Lost	Telemann Portal; Catalogue TWV
TVWV 1	TVWV 1:95a	Armselige Weisheit	Feast of the Holy Trinity	Solo voice with violin, viola and continuo	Version	Catalogue TWV
TVWV 1	TVWV 1:95b	Auch der Mangel wird	7th Sunday after Trinity	Solo voice with violin, viola and continuo	Version	Catalogue TWV
TVWV 1	TVWV 1:96	Auf ehernen Mauern, auf marmornen Gründen	1st Sunday after Easter	Solo voice with recorder and continuo	—	Telemann Portal; Catalogue TWV
TVWV 1	TVWV 1:97	Auf ein gleich-erhörtes Flehen	14th Sunday after Trinity	Solo viola and SATB with 2 oboes, 2 violas and continuo	—	Telemann Portal; Catalogue TWV
TVWV 1	TVWV 1:98	Auf, erwachet, meine Sinnen	3rd day of Christmas	Solo viola and SATB with 2 violins, viola, cello and continuo	—	Telemann Portal; Catalogue TWV
TVWV 1	TVWV 1:99	Auf, fröhliches Zion, auf, danket mit..	New Year	Solo bass with 2 violins, viola, cello and continuo	—	Telemann Portal; Catalogue TWV
TVWV 1	TVWV 1:100	Auf Gott will ich mich stets verlassen	Miscellaneous cantatas	SB duet with violin, double bass and harpsichord	—	Telemann Portal; Catalogue TWV
TVWV 1	TVWV 1:101	Auf grüner Auen wollest du mich	Feast of Pentecost	SATB with 2 oboes, 2 bugles, 2 violins, viola, cello and continuo	—	Telemann Portal; Catalogue TWV
TVWV 1	TVWV 1:102	Auf, ihr Christen insgemein	Feast of the Epiphany	SATB with 2 violins, viola, cello and continuo	—	Telemann Portal; Catalogue TWV
TVWV 1	TVWV 1:103	Auf, ihr Priester, auf zum Schlachten	Palm Sunday	SATTBBB with flute, 2 violins, viola and continuo	—	Telemann Portal; Catalogue TWV
TVWV 1	TVWV 1:104	Auf, lasset in Zions geheiligten Hallen	Easter	SATB with 2 flutes, 2 oboes, 2 trumpets/horns, timpani, 2 violins, viola, cello and continuo	—	Telemann Portal; Catalogue TWV
TVWV 1	TVWV 1:105	Auf, lasset uns ein feines Lied	1st Sunday after Advent	—	Lost	Telemann Portal; Catalogue TWV
TVWV 1	TVWV 1:106	Auf, mein Herze, rüste dich	2nd Sunday of Advent	SATB with oboe, 2 violins, viola, cello and continuo	—	Telemann Portal; Catalogue TWV
TVWV 1	TVWV 1:107	Auf, reiniget das Feld der ungeschlachten Herzen	Sunday of Sexagesima	—	Lost	Telemann Portal; Catalogue TWV
TVWV 1	TVWV 1:108	Auf, und lasset uns besingen	Easter	Solo tenor with 2 violins and continuo	—	Telemann Portal; Catalogue TWV
TVWV 1	TVWV 1:109	Auf, Zion, und lass in geheiligten Hallen	Christmas Feast	SATB with 2 flutes, oboe, 2 bugles, timpani, 2 violins, viola, cello and continuo	—	Telemann Portal; Catalogue TWV
TVWV 1	TVWV 1:109a	Auf zum Streiten, auf zum	1st Sunday of Lent	Solo voice with violin, viola and continuo	Version	Catalogue TWV
TVWV 1	TVWV 1:110	Augenweide, Fleischeslust	Miscellaneous cantatas	2 voices with violin, cello and continuo	—	Telemann Portal; Catalogue TWV
TVWV 1	TVWV 1:111	Aus Gnaden seid ihr selig worden	20th Sunday after Trinity	—	Lost	Telemann Portal; Catalogue TWV
TVWV 1	TVWV 1:112	Aus Gnaden seid ihr selig worden	Septuagesima Sunday	SATB with 2 oboes, 3 trumpets, 2 violins, viola, cello and continuo	—	Telemann Portal; Catalogue TWV
TVWV 1	TVWV 1:113	Aus Gnaden seid ihr selig worden	Septuagesima Sunday	SAB with 2 violins, viola and continuo	—	Telemann Portal; Catalogue TWV
TVWV 1	TVWV 1:114	Aus Zion bricht an der schöne Glanz	2nd Sunday of Advent	SATB with oboe, 2 violins, viola, cello and continuo	—	Telemann Portal; Catalogue TWV
TVWV 1	TVWV 1:115	Barmherzig und gnädig ist der Herr	22nd Sunday after Trinity	—	Lost	Telemann Portal; Catalogue TWV
TVWV 1	TVWV 1:115a	Barmherzigkeit kann uns	6th Sunday after Trinity	Solo voice with violin, viola and continuo	Version	Catalogue TWV
TVWV 1	TVWV 1:116	Barmherzig und gnädig ist der Herr	22nd Sunday after Trinity	SATB with 2 oboes, 2 violins, viola, cello and continuo	—	Telemann Portal; Catalogue TWV
TVWV 1	TVWV 1:117	Bedenk, o Mensch, erwäge doch	Easter	—	Lost	Telemann Portal; Catalogue TWV
TVWV 1	TVWV 1:117a	Begluckte Mutter	Feast of the Epiphany	Solo voice with violin, viola and continuo	Version	Catalogue TWV
TVWV 1	TVWV 1:118	Beglückte Zeit, die uns des Wortes Licht	24th Sunday after Trinity	Solo voice with continuo	—	Telemann Portal; Catalogue TWV
TVWV 1	TVWV 1:119	Begnadigte Seelen gesegneter Christen	5th Sunday after Trinity	Solo voice with oboe and continuo	—	Telemann Portal; Catalogue TWV
TVWV 1	TVWV 1:120	Bei dem Herrn findet man Hülfe	12th Sunday after Trinity	SATB with 2 oboes, 2 violins, viola, cello and continuo	—	Telemann Portal; Catalogue TWV
TVWV 1	TVWV 1:121	Bekehret euch zu mir	3rd Sunday after Trinity	SATB with 2 oboes, 2 violins, viola, cello and continuo	—	Telemann Portal; Catalogue TWV
TVWV 1	TVWV 1:122	Belebende Lüfte	Easter	SATB with 2 oboes, 2 trumpets, timpani, 2 violins, viola, cello and continuo	—	Telemann Portal; Catalogue TWV
TVWV 1	TVWV 1:123	Bequemliches Leben, gemächlicher Stand	2nd Sunday after Easter	SATB, SATB with 2 violins, viola and continuo	—	Telemann Portal; Catalogue TWV
TVWV 1	TVWV 1:123a	Beschamt und zittern soll	3rd Sunday after Trinity	Solo voice with violin, viola and continuo	Version	Catalogue TWV
TVWV 1	TVWV 1:124	Bestelle dein Haus	16th Sunday after Trinity	SB with 2 recorders, 2 violins, viola and continuo	—	Telemann Portal; Catalogue TWV
TVWV 1	TVWV 1:125	Bete nur, betrübtes Herze	Rogation Festival	SATB with 2 violins, viola, cello and continuo	—	Telemann Portal; Catalogue TWV
TVWV 1	TVWV 1:125a	Betrubter Lohn der Missetaten	19th Sunday after Trinity	Solo voice with 2 oboes and continuo	Version	Catalogue TWV
TVWV 1	TVWV 1:125b	Beweget euch munter, ihr lassigen Hande	Septuagesima Sunday	Solo voice with violin and continuo	Version	Catalogue TWV
TVWV 1	TVWV 1:126	Halleluja, erhöhet die Täler	4th Sunday of Advent	—	= TVWV 1:458	Telemann Portal; Catalogue TWV
TVWV 1	TVWV 1:126a	Bist du denn so gar	2nd Sunday after Trinity	Solo voice with violin, viola and continuo	Version	Catalogue TWV
TVWV 1	TVWV 1:127	Bittet, so wird euch gegeben	Rogation Festival	SATB with 2 oboes, 2 violins, viola, cello and continuo	—	Telemann Portal; Catalogue TWV
TVWV 1	TVWV 1:128	Bittet, so wird euch gegeben	2nd Sunday of Lent	SATB with 2 flutes, 2 oboes, 2 violins, viola, cello and continuo	—	Telemann Portal; Catalogue TWV
TVWV 1	TVWV 1:129	Bittet, so wird euch gegeben	Rogation Festival	—	Lost	Telemann Portal; Catalogue TWV
TVWV 1	TVWV 1:130	Bleib, o Jesu, bleib bei mir	Miscellaneous cantatas	Soprano solo with 2 violins and continuo	—	Telemann Portal; Catalogue TWV
TVWV 1	TVWV 1:130a	Blitz, der Herz und Geist	11th Sunday after Trinity	Solo voice with violin, viola and continuo	Version	Catalogue TWV
TVWV 1	TVWV 1:130b	Blut, das Glut und Eifer	Palm Sunday	Solo voice with violin, viola and continuo	Version	Catalogue TWV
TVWV 1	TVWV 1:131	Brannte nicht unser Herz in uns	2nd day of Easter	SATB with 2 oboes, 2 violins, viola, cello and continuo	—	Telemann Portal; Catalogue TWV
TVWV 1	TVWV 1:132	Brausende Stürme, wallende Wellen	4th Sunday after Epiphany	SATB with 2 oboes, 2 violins, viola, cello and continuo	—	Telemann Portal; Catalogue TWV
TVWV 1	TVWV 1:132a	Brecht, heisse Seufzer, los	3rd Sunday after Easter	Solo voice with violin, viola and continuo	Version	Catalogue TWV
TVWV 1	TVWV 1:133	Brich auf und werde lichte	Christmas Feast	SATB with oboe, 2 trumpets, timpani, 2 violins, viola, cello and continuo	—	Telemann Portal; Catalogue TWV
TVWV 1	TVWV 1:134	Brich dem Hungrigen dein Brot	13th Sunday after Trinity	SATB with 2 oboes, 2 violins, viola, cello and continuo	—	Telemann Portal; Catalogue TWV
TVWV 1	TVWV 1:135	Christen heißen und nicht sein	4th Sunday of Advent	SATB with 2 oboes, 2 violins, viola, cello and continuo	—	Telemann Portal; Catalogue TWV
TVWV 1	TVWV 1:136	Christ ist erstanden von der Marter	Easter	SATB with 2 oboes, 2 violins, 2 violas, cello and continuo	—	Telemann Portal; Catalogue TWV
TVWV 1	TVWV 1:137	Christum lieb haben ist besser	18th Sunday after Trinity	SATB with 2 flutes, 2 oboes, 2 violins, viola, cello and continuo	—	Telemann Portal; Catalogue TWV
TVWV 1	TVWV 1:138	Christus, der ist mein Leben	Choral cantata	SATB with 2 oboes, 2 violins, viola, cello and continuo	—	Telemann Portal; Catalogue TWV
TVWV 1	TVWV 1:139	Christus hat ausgezogen die Fürstentümer	Easter	SATB with 2 flutes, 3 bugles, timpani, 2 violins, viola, cello and continuo	—	Telemann Portal; Catalogue TWV
TVWV 1	TVWV 1:140	Christus hat einmal für die Sünde gelitten	Sunday of Quinquagesima	SATB with 2 oboes, 2 violins, viola and continuo	—	Telemann Portal; Catalogue TWV
TVWV 1	TVWV 1:141	Christus hat gelitten für uns	Palm Sunday	SATB with 2 oboes, 2 violins, viola, cello and continuo	—	Telemann Portal; Catalogue TWV
TVWV 1	TVWV 1:142	Christus hat sich selbst für uns gegeben	17th Sunday after Trinity	SATB with 2 oboes, 2 violins, viola, cello and continuo	—	Telemann Portal; Catalogue TWV
TVWV 1	TVWV 1:143	Christus hat uns ein Vorbild	23rd Sunday after Trinity	—	Lost	Telemann Portal; Catalogue TWV
TVWV 1	TVWV 1:144	Christus hat unsere Sünde selbst	Feast of the Assumption of Mary	SATB with 2 oboes, 2 violins, viola, cello and continuo	—	Telemann Portal; Catalogue TWV
TVWV 1	TVWV 1:145	Christus ist aufgefahren in die Höhe	Ascension Day	SATB with 2 oboes, 2 violins, viola, cello and continuo	—	Telemann Portal; Catalogue TWV
TVWV 1	TVWV 1:146	Christus ist das wahrhaftige Licht	Feast of the Epiphany	—	Lost	Telemann Portal; Catalogue TWV
TVWV 1	TVWV 1:147	Christus ist das wahrhaftige Licht	Feast of the Epiphany	—	Lost	Telemann Portal; Catalogue TWV
TVWV 1	TVWV 1:148	Christus ist der Glanz	Feast of the Purification of Mary	SATB with 2 violins, viola, cello and continuo	—	Telemann Portal; Catalogue TWV
TVWV 1	TVWV 1:149	Christus ist kommen	Sunday after Ascension Day	SATB with 2 oboes, 2 violins, viola, cello and continuo	—	Telemann Portal; Catalogue TWV
TVWV 1	TVWV 1:150	Christus ist nicht eingegangen	4th Sunday after Easter	SATB with 2 oboes, 2 violins, viola, cello and continuo	—	Telemann Portal; Catalogue TWV
TVWV 1	TVWV 1:151	Christus ist um unserer Missetat willen	Sunday of Quinquagesima	SATB with 2 oboes, 2 bugles, bassoon, 2 violins, viola, cello and continuo	—	Telemann Portal; Catalogue TWV
TVWV 1	TVWV 1:152	Christus ist wahrlich der Prophet	4th Sunday of Lent	SATB with 2 oboes, 2 violins, viola, cello and continuo	—	Telemann Portal; Catalogue TWV
TVWV 1	TVWV 1:153	Da die Zeit erfüllet ward	Feast of the Assumption of Mary	—	Lost	Telemann Portal; Catalogue TWV
TVWV 1	TVWV 1:154	Da aber die Zeit erfüllet war	2nd day of the Christmas festival	SATB with 2 bugles, timpani, 2 violins, viola and continuo	—	Telemann Portal; Catalogue TWV
TVWV 1	TVWV 1:155	Dafür halte uns jedermann	9th Sunday after Trinity	SATB with 2 oboes, 2 violins, viola, cello and continuo	—	Telemann Portal; Catalogue TWV
TVWV 1	TVWV 1:155a	Du bist mir, schnödes Gut der Erden	12th Sunday after Trinity	Solo voice with recorder, oboe and continuo	Version	Catalogue TWV
TVWV 1	TVWV 1:156	Da Jesus nun merkte	4th Sunday of Lent	SATB with 2 oboes, 2 violins, viola, cello and continuo	—	Telemann Portal; Catalogue TWV
TVWV 1	TVWV 1:157	Danket dem Herrn, denn er ist freundlich	Sunday after Christmas	SATB with 2 oboes, 2 horns, 2 violins, viola, cello and continuo	—	Telemann Portal; Catalogue TWV
TVWV 1	TVWV 1:158	Danket dem Herrn, denn er ist freundlich	Feast of St. John the Baptist	SATB with 2 violins, viola, cello and continuo	—	Telemann Portal; Catalogue TWV
TVWV 1	TVWV 1:159	Danket dem Herrn, denn er ist freundlich	New Year	SATB with flute, 2 oboes, 2 horns, 2 violins, viola, cello and continuo	—	Telemann Portal; Catalogue TWV
TVWV 1	TVWV 1:160	Danket dem Herrn und prediget	Feast of St. Michael	—	Lost	Telemann Portal; Catalogue TWV
TVWV 1	TVWV 1:161	Danket dem Herrn und prediget	14th Sunday after Trinity	—	Lost	Telemann Portal; Catalogue TWV
TVWV 1	TVWV 1:162	Danket dem Herrn und prediget	New Year	—	Lost	Telemann Portal; Catalogue TWV
TVWV 1	TVWV 1:163	Danket dem Herrn Zebaoth	Sunday after Christmas	SATB with flute, 2 oboes, 2 blowtorches, 2 violins, viola, cello and continuo	—	Telemann Portal; Catalogue TWV
TVWV 1	TVWV 1:164	Daran erkennen wir	Feast of Pentecost	SATB with 2 bugles, bassoon, timpani, 2 violins, viola, cello and continuo	—	Telemann Portal; Catalogue TWV
TVWV 1	TVWV 1:165	Daran ist erschienen die Liebe Gottes	2nd day of the feast of Pentecost	SATB with 2 oboes, 2 violins, viola, cello and continuo	—	Telemann Portal; Catalogue TWV
TVWV 1	TVWV 1:166	Darzu ist erschienen die Liebe Gottes	3rd day of Christmas	SATB with 2 oboes, 2 violins, viola, cello and continuo	—	Telemann Portal; Catalogue TWV
TVWV 1	TVWV 1:167	Daran ist erschienen die Liebe Gottes	3rd day of Christmas	SATB with 2 violins, viola, cello and continuo	—	Telemann Portal; Catalogue TWV
TVWV 1	TVWV 1:168	Daran ist erschienen die Liebe Gottes	2nd day of the feast of Pentecost	SATB with 2 oboes, 2 horns, 2 violins, viola, cello and continuo	—	Telemann Portal; Catalogue TWV
TVWV 1	TVWV 1:169	Es wird ein Tag sein	25th Sunday after Trinity	SATB with flute, oboe, 2 violins, viola, cello and continuo	= TVWV 1:541	Telemann Portal; Catalogue TWV
TVWV 1	TVWV 1:170	Das Blöken der Schafe, das Brüllen der Rinder	Feast of the Assumption of Mary	—	—	Telemann Portal; Catalogue TWV
TVWV 1	TVWV 1:171	Das Blut Christi wird unser Gewissen reinigen	14th Sunday after Trinity	SATB with 2 oboes, 2 violins, viola, cello and continuo	= TVWV 1:896	Telemann Portal; Catalogue TWV
TVWV 1	TVWV 1:172	Das Blut Jesu Christi, des Sohnes Gottes	1st Sunday after Easter	SATB with 2 oboes, horn, 2 violins, viola, cello and continuo	—	Telemann Portal; Catalogue TWV
TVWV 1	TVWV 1:173	Das ewge Licht geht da herein	3rd day of Christmas	Bass solo and SATB with 2 violins, viola and continuo	—	Telemann Portal; Catalogue TWV
TVWV 1	TVWV 1:174	Das heulende Winseln aus Belials Rachen	Easter	SATB with 2 flutes, 2 oboes, 2 trumpets, 2 violins, viola, cello and continuo	—	Telemann Portal; Catalogue TWV
TVWV 1	TVWV 1:175	Da sie aber davon redeten	3rd day of Easter	SATB with 2 violins, viola, cello and continuo	—	Telemann Portal; Catalogue TWV
TVWV 1	TVWV 1:176	Das ist das ewige Leben	3rd day of the feast of Pentecost	SATB with 2 flutes/haubs, 2 violins, viola, cello and continuo	—	Telemann Portal; Catalogue TWV
TVWV 1	TVWV 1:177	Das ist das ewige Leben	3rd day of the feast of Pentecost	SATB with 2 oboes, 2 violins, viola, cello and continuo	—	Telemann Portal; Catalogue TWV
TVWV 1	TVWV 1:178	Das ist die Freudigkeit	Rogation Festival	SATB with 2 violins, viola and continuo	—	Telemann Portal; Catalogue TWV
TVWV 1	TVWV 1:179	Das ist die Freudigkeit	19th Sunday after Trinity	—	Lost	Telemann Portal; Catalogue TWV
TVWV 1	TVWV 1:180	Das ist ein köstlich Ding	14th Sunday after Trinity	SATB with 2 oboes, bugle, 2 violins, viola, cello and continuo	—	Telemann Portal; Catalogue TWV
TVWV 1	TVWV 1:181	Das ist je gewisslich wahr	3rd Sunday after Trinity	SATB with 2 oboes, 2 violins, viola, cello and continuo	—	Telemann Portal; Catalogue TWV
TVWV 1	TVWV 1:182	Das ist je gewisslich wahr	3rd Sunday of Advent	SATB with 2 oboes, 2 violins, viola, cello and continuo	—	Telemann Portal; Catalogue TWV
TVWV 1	TVWV 1:183	Das ist je gewisslich wahr	3rd Sunday of Advent	SATB with 2 oboes, 2 violins, viola, cello and continuo	= BWV 141	Telemann Portal; Catalogue TWV
TVWV 1	TVWV 1:184	Das ist je gewisslich wahr	3rd Sunday of Advent	SATB with 2 flutes, 2 oboes, 2 violins, viola, cello and continuo	—	Telemann Portal; Catalogue TWV
TVWV 1	TVWV 1:185	Das ist lieblich, das ist fein	Feast of the Purification of Mary	—	Lost	Telemann Portal; Catalogue TWV
TVWV 1	TVWV 1:186	Das ist meine Freude und Zuversicht	Miscellaneous cantatas	SATB with 2 violins, viola, cello and continuo	—	Telemann Portal; Catalogue TWV
TVWV 1	TVWV 1:187	Das ist meine Freude	Miscellaneous cantatas	Solo bass with 2 oboes, 2 violins, viola, cello and continuo	—	Telemann Portal; Catalogue TWV
TVWV 1	TVWV 1:188	Das ist meine Freude, dass ich mich	Feast of the Visitation of Mary	SATB with flute, 2 oboes, bassoon, 2 violins, viola, cello and continuo	—	Telemann Portal; Catalogue TWV
TVWV 1	TVWV 1:189	Das ist sein Gebot, dass wir gläuben	13th Sunday after Trinity	SAB with 2 violins, viola and continuo	—	Telemann Portal; Catalogue TWV
TVWV 1	TVWV 1:190	Das Kreuz ist eine Liebesprobe	21st Sunday after Trinity	SATB with 2 oboes, 2 violins, viola, cello and continuo	—	Telemann Portal; Catalogue TWV
TVWV 1	TVWV 1:191	Das macht Gottes Vaterherz	Feast of St. John the Baptist	Solo viola and SATB with 2 violins and continuo	—	Telemann Portal; Catalogue TWV
TVWV 1	TVWV 1:192	Das Manna deiner Speise	Choral cantata for communion	Solo bass with 2 flutes, 2 violins, 2 violas, cello and continuo	—	Telemann Portal; Catalogue TWV
TVWV 1	TVWV 1:193	Das Reich Gottes ist nicht essen und trinken	2nd Sunday after Trinity	SATB with 2 oboes, 2 violins, viola, cello and continuo	—	Telemann Portal; Catalogue TWV
TVWV 1	TVWV 1:194	Dass Herz und Sinn, o schwacher Mensch	27th Sunday after Trinity	Solo voice with violin and continuo	—	Telemann Portal; Catalogue TWV
TVWV 1	TVWV 1:195	Das sollst du wissen, dass in den letzten Tagen	25th Sunday after Trinity	SAB with 2 violins, viola and continuo	—	Telemann Portal; Catalogue TWV
TVWV 1	TVWV 1:196	Das weiß ich fürwahr	3rd Sunday after Easter	SATB with 2 oboes, 2 violins, viola, cello and continuo	—	Telemann Portal; Catalogue TWV
TVWV 1	TVWV 1:197	Das weiß ich fürwahr, wer Gott dienet	Feast of St. John the Baptist	SATB with 2 oboes, 2 violins, viola, cello and continuo	—	Telemann Portal; Catalogue TWV
TVWV 1	TVWV 1:198	Das weiß ich fürwahr	24th Sunday after Trinity	SAB with 2 violins, viola and continuo	—	Telemann Portal; Catalogue TWV
TVWV 1	TVWV 1:199	Das Wetter rührt mit Strahl und Blitzen	9th Sunday after Trinity	Solo voice with oboe and continuo	—	Telemann Portal; Catalogue TWV
TVWV 1	TVWV 1:200	Das Wort Jesus Christus ist das wahrhaftige Licht	3rd day of Christmas	SATB with 2 oboes, 2 violins, viola, cello and continuo	—	Telemann Portal; Catalogue TWV
TVWV 1	TVWV 1:201	Das Wort ward Fleisch	Sunday after Christmas	—	Lost	Telemann Portal; Catalogue TWV
TVWV 1	TVWV 1:202	Das Wort ward Fleisch und wohnet unter uns	3rd Sunday of Advent	SATB with 2 violins, viola, cello and continuo	—	Telemann Portal; Catalogue TWV
TVWV 1	TVWV 1:203	Das Wort ward Fleisch	Christmas Feast	SATB with 2 oboes, 2 bugles, timpani, 2 violins, viola, cello and continuo	—	Telemann Portal; Catalogue TWV
TVWV 1	TVWV 1:204	Davids Sohn, lass mich Hilfe schauen	2nd Sunday of Lent	SATB with 2 violins, viola, cello and continuo	—	Telemann Portal; Catalogue TWV
TVWV 1	TVWV 1:205	Dazu ist erschienen der Sohn Gottes	3rd Sunday of Lent	SATB with 2 oboes, 2 violins, viola, cello and continuo	—	Telemann Portal; Catalogue TWV
TVWV 1	TVWV 1:206	Dazu ist erschienen der Sohn Gottes	2nd day of the Christmas festival	SATB with 2 oboes, 3 bugles, timpani, 2 violins, viola, cello and continuo	—	Telemann Portal; Catalogue TWV
TVWV 1	TVWV 1:207	Darzu ist erschienen der Sohn Gottes	3rd Sunday of Lent	SATB with 2 oboes, 2 violins, viola, cello and continuo	—	Telemann Portal; Catalogue TWV
TVWV 1	TVWV 1:208	Dazu ist erschienen der Sohn Gottes	3rd Sunday of Lent	SSATB with 2 violins, viola, cello and continuo	—	Telemann Portal; Catalogue TWV
TVWV 1	TVWV 1:209	Deine Liebe, liebster Jesu	2nd day of Easter	SATB with 2 violins, viola, cello and continuo	—	Telemann Portal; Catalogue TWV
TVWV 1	TVWV 1:210	Deine Reden sind mir süße	24th Sunday after Trinity	—	Lost	Telemann Portal; Catalogue TWV
TVWV 1	TVWV 1:211	Deiner Sanftmut Schild	6th Sunday after Trinity	Solo tenor and SATB with 2 violins, viola, cello and continuo	—	Telemann Portal; Catalogue TWV
TVWV 1	TVWV 1:212	Deines neuen Bundes Gnade	13th Sunday after Trinity	Solo voice with flute and continuo	—	Telemann Portal; Catalogue TWV
TVWV 1	TVWV 1:213	Deine Toten werden leben	Rogation Festival	Solo voice with recorder and continuo	—	Telemann Portal; Catalogue TWV
TVWV 1	TVWV 1:214	Dein gnädig Ohr	Rogation Festival	Solo viola and SATB with 2 violins, viola and continuo	—	Telemann Portal; Catalogue TWV
TVWV 1	TVWV 1:215	Dein Schade ist verzweifelt böse	14th Sunday after Trinity	SATB with oboe, 2 violins, viola, cello and continuo	—	Telemann Portal; Catalogue TWV
TVWV 1	TVWV 1:216	Dein Wort ist meinem Munde süßer denn Honig	Sunday of Sexagesima	SATB with flute, 2 oboes, 2 violins, viola, cello and continuo	—	Telemann Portal; Catalogue TWV
TVWV 1	TVWV 1:217	Dein Wort ist meines Herzens Trost	Sunday of Sexagesima	SATB with 2 oboes, 2 violins, viola, cello and continuo	—	Telemann Portal; Catalogue TWV
TVWV 1	TVWV 1:218	Dem Herren musst du trauen	15th Sunday after Trinity	SATB with 2 oboes, 2 violins, viola, cello and continuo	—	Telemann Portal; Catalogue TWV
TVWV 1	TVWV 1:219	Dem höchsten Gott zu loben	Cantata for the Feast of Thanksgiving	Solo bass with horn, 2 violins and continuo	—	Telemann Portal; Catalogue TWV
TVWV 1	TVWV 1:219a	Demut ist der Tugend Krone	17th Sunday after Trinity	Solo voice with violin, viola and continuo	Version	Catalogue TWV
TVWV 1	TVWV 1:219b	Den Christen mischt Christus	2nd day of Easter	Solo voice with flute, violin and continuo	Version	Catalogue TWV
TVWV 1	TVWV 1:220	Denen, die Gott lieben	21st Sunday after Trinity	SATB with 2 oboes, 2 violins, viola, cello and continuo	—	Telemann Portal; Catalogue TWV
TVWV 1	TVWV 1:221	Den Frommen geht das Licht auf	Feast of the Purification of Mary	SATB with 2 oboes, 2 violins, viola, cello and continuo	—	Telemann Portal; Catalogue TWV
TVWV 1	TVWV 1:222	Dennoch bleib ich immer stille	17th Sunday after Trinity	SATB with 2 oboes, 3 bugles, timpani, 2 violins, viola, cello and continuo	—	Telemann Portal; Catalogue TWV
TVWV 1	TVWV 1:223	Dennoch bleib[e] ich stets an dir	12th Sunday after Trinity	SATB with 2 oboes, 2 violins, viola, cello and continuo	—	Telemann Portal; Catalogue TWV
TVWV 1	TVWV 1:224	Dennoch bleib ich stets an dir	9th Sunday after Trinity	SATB with 2 oboes, 2 violins, viola, cello and continuo	—	Telemann Portal; Catalogue TWV
TVWV 1	TVWV 1:225	Dennoch bleib ich stets an dir	2nd Sunday of Lent	Solo bass and SATB with 2 violins, viola, cello and continuo	—	Telemann Portal; Catalogue TWV
TVWV 1	TVWV 1:226	Denn so jemand das ganze Gesetz	13th Sunday after Trinity	SATB with 2 oboes, 2 violins, viola, cello and continuo	—	Telemann Portal; Catalogue TWV
TVWV 1	TVWV 1:227	Den Reichen von dieser Welt	9th Sunday after Trinity	SATB with 2 oboes, 2 violins, viola, cello and continuo	—	Telemann Portal; Catalogue TWV
TVWV 1	TVWV 1:228	Den Reichen von dieser Welt	9th Sunday after Trinity	SATB with 2 violins, viola and continuo	—	Telemann Portal; Catalogue TWV
TVWV 1	TVWV 1:229	Der Allergrößteste von Weisheit	17th Sunday after Trinity	SATB with 2 oboes, 2 violins, viola, cello and continuo	—	Telemann Portal; Catalogue TWV
TVWV 1	TVWV 1:230	Der alte Drach und böse Feind	Feast of St. Michael	—	Lost	Telemann Portal; Catalogue TWV
TVWV 1	TVWV 1:231	Der arme Mensch muss durch der Sünden Schuld	4th Sunday after Easter	SATB with 2 oboes, 2 violins, viola, cello and continuo	—	Telemann Portal; Catalogue TWV
TVWV 1	TVWV 1:232	Der Engel des Herrn lagert sich	Feast of St. Michael	SATB with 2 horns, 2 violins, viola, cello and continuo	—	Telemann Portal; Catalogue TWV
TVWV 1	TVWV 1:233	Der Engel des Herrn lagert sich	Feast of St. Michael	—	Lost	Telemann Portal; Catalogue TWV
TVWV 1	TVWV 1:234	Der Engel des Herrn lagert sich	Feast of St. Michael	—	Lost	Telemann Portal; Catalogue TWV
TVWV 1	TVWV 1:235	Der Engel des Herrn lagert sich	Feast of St. Michael	SATB with 2 oboes, 2 violins, viola, cello and continuo	—	Telemann Portal; Catalogue TWV
TVWV 1	TVWV 1:236	Der Engel des Herrn lagert sich	Feast of St. Michael	—	Lost	Telemann Portal; Catalogue TWV
TVWV 1	TVWV 1:237	Der Feind ist viel	9th Sunday after Trinity	SATB with 2 flutes, oboe, horn, 2 violins, viola and continuo	—	Telemann Portal; Catalogue TWV
TVWV 1	TVWV 1:238	Der feste Grund Gottes bestehet	2nd Sunday after Easter	SATB with 2 oboes, 2 chalumeaux, 2 violins, viola, cello and continuo	—	Telemann Portal; Catalogue TWV
TVWV 1	TVWV 1:239	Der Friede Gottes, welcher höher ist	1st Sunday after Easter	SATB with 2 oboes, 2 horns, trumpet, 2 violins, viola, cello and continuo	—	Telemann Portal; Catalogue TWV
TVWV 1	TVWV 1:240	Der Friede Gottes, welcher	1st Sunday after Easter	—	Lost	Telemann Portal; Catalogue TWV
TVWV 1	TVWV 1:241	Der Fromme muss allhier gar vieles leiden	Sunday after Ascension Day	—	Lost	Telemann Portal; Catalogue TWV
TVWV 1	TVWV 1:242	Der Geist des Herrn, Herrn	3rd day of the feast of Pentecost	SATB with 2 violins, viola, cello and continuo	—	Telemann Portal; Catalogue TWV
TVWV 1	TVWV 1:243	Der Geist gibt Zeugnis	Feast of Pentecost	SATB with 2 trumpets, timpani, 2 violins, viola and continuo	—	Telemann Portal; Catalogue TWV
TVWV 1	TVWV 1:244	Der Geiz	1st Sunday after Trinity	—	Lost	Telemann Portal; Catalogue TWV
TVWV 1	TVWV 1:245	Der Gerechte kommt um	Feast of the Purification of Mary	SATB with 2 oboes, 2 violins, viola, cello and continuo	—	Telemann Portal; Catalogue TWV
TVWV 1	TVWV 1:246	Der Gerechte muss viel leiden	1st Sunday after Trinity	SATB with 2 oboes, 2 violins, viola, cello and continuo	—	Telemann Portal; Catalogue TWV
TVWV 1	TVWV 1:247	Der Gerechte muss viel leiden	1st Sunday after Trinity	SATB with 2 oboes, 3 bugles, timpani, 2 violins, viola, cello and continuo	—	Telemann Portal; Catalogue TWV
TVWV 1	TVWV 1:248	Der Gerechten Seelen sind in	Feast of the Purification of Mary	—	Lost	Telemann Portal; Catalogue TWV
TVWV 1	TVWV 1:248a	Der Glaube muss dauern	21st Sunday after Trinity	Solo voice with violin, viola and continuo	Version	Catalogue TWV
TVWV 1	TVWV 1:249	Der Gott des Friedens zertrete	3rd day of Easter	SATB with 2 oboes, 2 violins, viola, cello and continuo	—	Telemann Portal; Catalogue TWV
TVWV 1	TVWV 1:250	Der Gott des Friedens, der von den Toten	2nd Sunday after Easter	SATB with 2 flutes, oboe, 2 violins, viola, cello and continuo	—	Telemann Portal; Catalogue TWV
TVWV 1	TVWV 1:251	Der Gottlose ist wie ein Wetter	23rd Sunday after Trinity	SATB with 2 guys, bassoon, 2 violins, viola, cello and continuo	—	Telemann Portal; Catalogue TWV
TVWV 1	TVWV 1:252	Der Gottlose lasse von seinen Wegen	10th Sunday after Trinity	SATB with 2 oboes, 2 violins, viola, cello and continuo	—	Telemann Portal; Catalogue TWV
TVWV 1	TVWV 1:253	Der Gottlose lauert	22nd Sunday after Trinity	—	Lost	Telemann Portal; Catalogue TWV
TVWV 1	TVWV 1:254	Der Gott unsers Herrn Jesu Christi	4th Sunday after Easter	SATB with 2 oboes, 2 violins, viola, cello and continuo	—	Telemann Portal; Catalogue TWV
TVWV 1	TVWV 1:255	Du Heiland aller Welt	Feast of the Purification of Mary	—	Lost	Telemann Portal; Catalogue TWV
TVWV 1	TVWV 1:256	Der Herr behütet alle	Sunday After New Year's Eve	—	Lost	Telemann Portal; Catalogue TWV
TVWV 1	TVWV 1:257	Der Herr bewahret die Seelen	Sunday After New Year's Eve	SATB with 2 oboes, 2 violins, viola, cello and continuo	—	Telemann Portal; Catalogue TWV
TVWV 1	TVWV 1:258	Der Herr, der Hüter Israel	4th Sunday after Epiphany	—	Lost	Telemann Portal; Catalogue TWV
TVWV 1	TVWV 1:259	Der Herr des Himmels ist mein Hirte	2nd Sunday after Easter	—	Lost	Telemann Portal; Catalogue TWV
TVWV 1	TVWV 1:260	Der Herr hat gesagt zu meinem Herrn	18th Sunday after Trinity	SATB with 2 oboes, 2 violins, viola, cello and continuo	—	Telemann Portal; Catalogue TWV
TVWV 1	TVWV 1:261	Der Herr hat offenbaret	Feast of the Epiphany	Solo voice with violin, viola and continuo	—	Telemann Portal; Catalogue TWV
TVWV 1	TVWV 1:262	Der Herr hat offenbaret	Christmas Feast	SATB with 2 oboes, 2 trumpets, timpani, 2 violins, viola, cello and continuo	—	Telemann Portal; Catalogue TWV
TVWV 1	TVWV 1:263	Der Herr ist mein getreuer Hirte	2nd Sunday after Easter	SATB with 2 oboes, bugle, 2 violins, 2 violas and continuo	—	Telemann Portal; Catalogue TWV
TVWV 1	TVWV 1:264	Der Herr ist mein Hirte	3rd day of the feast of Pentecost	SATB with 2 oboes, 2 violins, viola and continuo	—	Telemann Portal; Catalogue TWV
TVWV 1	TVWV 1:265	Der Herr ist mein Hirte	2nd Sunday after Easter	SATB with 2 oboes, 3 bugles, timpani, 2 violins, viola, cello and continuo	—	Telemann Portal; Catalogue TWV
TVWV 1	TVWV 1:266	Der Herr ist mein Hirte	2nd Sunday after Easter	SATB with 2 oboes, 2 violins, viola, cello and continuo	—	Telemann Portal; Catalogue TWV
TVWV 1	TVWV 1:267	Der Herr ist mein Hirte	2nd Sunday after Easter	—	Lost	Telemann Portal; Catalogue TWV
TVWV 1	TVWV 1:268	Der Herr ist mein Hirte	3rd day of the feast of Pentecost	SAB with 2 violins, viola and continuo	—	Telemann Portal; Catalogue TWV
TVWV 1	TVWV 1:269	Der Herr ist mein Hirte	16th Sunday after Trinity	—	Lost	Telemann Portal; Catalogue TWV
TVWV 1	TVWV 1:270	Der Herr ist mit mir, darum	3rd Sunday of Lent	—	Lost	Telemann Portal; Catalogue TWV
TVWV 1	TVWV 1:271	Der Herr ist nahe allen denen, die	3rd Sunday after Epiphany	—	Lost	Telemann Portal; Catalogue TWV
TVWV 1	TVWV 1:272	Der Herr ist nahe allen, die ihn	3rd Sunday after Easter	—	Lost	Telemann Portal; Catalogue TWV
TVWV 1	TVWV 1:273	Der Herr ist nahe allen, die ihn anrufen	2nd Sunday of Lent	SATB with 2 oboes, 2 violins, viola, cello and continuo	—	Telemann Portal; Catalogue TWV
TVWV 1	TVWV 1:274	Der Herr ist nahe allen, die ihn anrufen	3rd Sunday after Epiphany	SATB with 2 oboes, 2 violins, viola, cello and continuo	—	Telemann Portal; Catalogue TWV
TVWV 1	TVWV 1:275	Der Herr ist nahe bei denen	3rd day of Easter	SATB with 2 oboes, 2 violins, viola, double bass and continuo	—	Telemann Portal; Catalogue TWV
TVWV 1	TVWV 1:276	Der Herr ist nahe bei denen	2nd day of Easter	SATB with 2 oboes, 2 violins, viola, cello and continuo	—	Telemann Portal; Catalogue TWV
TVWV 1	TVWV 1:277	Der Herr ist Sonn und Schild	Feast of St. John the Baptist	SATB with 3 bugles, timpani, 2 violins, viola, cello and continuo	—	Telemann Portal; Catalogue TWV
TVWV 1	TVWV 1:278	Der Herr ist unser Gott	Septuagesima Sunday	SATB with 2 oboes, 2 violins, viola and continuo	—	Telemann Portal; Catalogue TWV
TVWV 1	TVWV 1:279	Der Herr Jesus wird offenbaret werden	1st Sunday after Trinity	SATB with 2 oboes, 2 violins, viola, cello and continuo	—	Telemann Portal; Catalogue TWV
TVWV 1	TVWV 1:280	Der Herr kennet die Tage der Frommen	4th Sunday of Lent	SATB with 2 flutes/oboe, 2 violins, viola, cello and continuo	—	Telemann Portal; Catalogue TWV
TVWV 1	TVWV 1:281	Der Herr kennet die Tage der Frommen	4th Sunday of Lent	SATB with 2 oboes, 2 violins, viola, cello and continuo	—	Telemann Portal; Catalogue TWV
TVWV 1	TVWV 1:282	Der Herr kennet die Tage der Frommen	5th Sunday after Trinity	SATB with 2 oboes, 2 violins, viola, cello and continuo	—	Telemann Portal; Catalogue TWV
TVWV 1	TVWV 1:283	Der Herr kennet die Tage der Frommen	2nd Sunday after Epiphany	SAB with [2 oboes], 2 violins, viola, cello and continuo	—	Telemann Portal; Catalogue TWV
TVWV 1	TVWV 1:284	Der Herr lebet und gelobet	Easter	SATB with 2 trumpets, timpani, 2 violins, viola, cello and continuo	—	Telemann Portal; Catalogue TWV
TVWV 1	TVWV 1:285	Der Herr regieret	4th Sunday of Advent	SATB with 2 violins, viola, cello and continuo	—	Telemann Portal; Catalogue TWV
TVWV 1	TVWV 1:286	Der Herr schauet vom Himmel	20th Sunday after Trinity	—	Lost	Telemann Portal; Catalogue TWV
TVWV 1	TVWV 1:287	Der Herr sprach zu meinem Herrn	Ascension Day	SATB with 2 violins, 2 violas, cello and continuo	—	Telemann Portal; Catalogue TWV
TVWV 1	TVWV 1:288	Der Herr verstößet nicht ewiglich	21st Sunday after Trinity	SATB with 2 oboes, 2 violins, 2 violas, cello and continuo	—	Telemann Portal; Catalogue TWV
TVWV 1	TVWV 1:289	Der Herr weiß die Gottseligen	1st Sunday of Lent	SATB with 2 oboes, 2 violins, viola, cello and continuo	—	Telemann Portal; Catalogue TWV
TVWV 1	TVWV 1:290	Der Herr weiß die Gottseligen	3rd Sunday of Lent	SATB with 2 oboes, 2 violins, viola, cello and continuo	—	Telemann Portal; Catalogue TWV
TVWV 1	TVWV 1:291	Der Herr wird den Elenden	Sunday after Ascension Day	SATB with 2 oboes, 2 violins, viola, cello and continuo	—	Telemann Portal; Catalogue TWV
TVWV 1	TVWV 1:292	Der Herr wird dich schlagen	10th Sunday after Trinity	SATB with 2 oboes, 2 violins, viola, cello and continuo	—	Telemann Portal; Catalogue TWV
TVWV 1	TVWV 1:293	Der Herr wird ein Neues im Lande schaffen	20th Sunday after Trinity	SATB with 2 oboes, 2 violins, viola, cello and continuo	—	Telemann Portal; Catalogue TWV
TVWV 1	TVWV 1:294	Und der Herr Zebaoth	2nd Sunday after Trinity	—	= TVWV 1:1432	Telemann Portal; Catalogue TWV
TVWV 1	TVWV 1:295	Der Himmel ist offen, der Himmel ist mein	Ascension Day	SATB with 2 oboes, bassoon, 2 violins, viola, cello and continuo	—	Telemann Portal; Catalogue TWV
TVWV 1	TVWV 1:296	Der Himmel ist offen, mein Jesus	Ascension Day	SATB with 2 oboes, 2 violins, viola, cello and continuo	—	Telemann Portal; Catalogue TWV
TVWV 1	TVWV 1:296a	Der Himmelskonig will	23rd Sunday after Trinity	Solo voice with violin, viola and continuo	Version	Catalogue TWV
TVWV 1	TVWV 1:297	Der Himmel wird heiter	Ascension Day	SATB with oboe, 2 trumpets, timpani, 2 violins, viola, cello and continuo	—	Telemann Portal; Catalogue TWV
TVWV 1	TVWV 1:298	Der himmlischen Geister unzählbare Menge	Feast of St. Michael	Solo soprano with violin and continuo	—	Telemann Portal; Catalogue TWV
TVWV 1	TVWV 1:299	Der ist gerecht vor Gott allein	6th Sunday after Trinity	—	Lost	Telemann Portal; Catalogue TWV
TVWV 1	TVWV 1:300	Der höchste Gott ist rein	5th Sunday after Epiphany	SATB with 2 oboes, 2 violins, viola, cello and continuo	—	Telemann Portal; Catalogue TWV
TVWV 1	TVWV 1:301	Der jüngste Tag wird bald sein Ziel erreichen	2nd Sunday of Advent	SATB with 2 oboes, bassoon, 2 violins, viola, cello and continuo	—	Telemann Portal; Catalogue TWV
TVWV 1	TVWV 1:302	Der jüngste Tag wird bald sein Ziel erreichen	2nd Sunday of Advent	SATB with 2 violins, viola, cello and continuo	—	Telemann Portal; Catalogue TWV
TVWV 1	TVWV 1:303	Der Kern verdammter Sünder	Passion Sunday	SATB with 2 oboes, 2 violins, viola, cello and continuo	—	Telemann Portal; Catalogue TWV
TVWV 1	TVWV 1:304	Du König der Ehren, Jesu Christ	18th Sunday after Trinity	—	Lost	Telemann Portal; Catalogue TWV
TVWV 1	TVWV 1:305	Der Mensch lebt nicht allein	6th Sunday after Epiphany	—	Lost	Telemann Portal; Catalogue TWV
TVWV 1	TVWV 1:306	Der mit Sünden beleidigte Heiland	New Year	SATB with 2 oboes, 3 trumpets, timpani, 2 violins, viola, cello and continuo	—	Telemann Portal; Catalogue TWV
TVWV 1	TVWV 1:307	Der Morgenstern will bei der Nacht	Feast of St. John the Baptist	—	Lost	Telemann Portal; Catalogue TWV
TVWV 1	TVWV 1:308	Der natürliche Mensch verstehet nichts	Feast of the Trinity	SATB with 2 oboes, 2 violins, viola, cello and continuo	—	Telemann Portal; Catalogue TWV
TVWV 1	TVWV 1:309	Der Segen des Herrn machet reich ohne Mühe	7th Sunday after Trinity	SATB with 2 oboes, 2 violins, viola, cello and continuo	—	Telemann Portal; Catalogue TWV
TVWV 1	TVWV 1:310	Der Segen des Herrn machet reich ohne Mühe	5th Sunday after Trinity	SATB with 2 violins, viola, cello and continuo	—	Telemann Portal; Catalogue TWV
TVWV 1	TVWV 1:311	Der Segen des Herrn machet reich ohne Mühe	5th Sunday after Trinity	SATB with 2 oboes, 2 violins, viola, cello and continuo	—	Telemann Portal; Catalogue TWV
TVWV 1	TVWV 1:312	Der Regen Gottes fällt auf gute Sprossen	5th Sunday after Epiphany	Solo voice with 2 violins and continuo	—	Telemann Portal; Catalogue TWV
TVWV 1	TVWV 1:313	Der Reichtum macht allein beglückt	2nd Sunday of Lent	Solo voice with oboe and continuo	—	Telemann Portal; Catalogue TWV
TVWV 1	TVWV 1:314	Des Herren Ruf, o Mensch, klopft	Feast of the Assumption of Mary	—	Lost	Telemann Portal; Catalogue TWV
TVWV 1	TVWV 1:315	Der Satan bläset oft den Frömmsten	1st Sunday after Easter	—	Lost	Telemann Portal; Catalogue TWV
TVWV 1	TVWV 1:316	Der Segen des Herrn machet reich	5th Sunday after Trinity	SAB with 2 violins, viola and continuo	—	Telemann Portal; Catalogue TWV
TVWV 1	TVWV 1:317	Der Sohn Gottes hat mich geliebet	2nd Sunday after Easter	SATB with 2 oboes, 2 violins, viola, cello and continuo	—	Telemann Portal; Catalogue TWV
TVWV 1	TVWV 1:318	Der Stein, den die Bauleute	Sunday after Christmas	—	Lost	Telemann Portal; Catalogue TWV
TVWV 1	TVWV 1:319	Der Stein, den die Bauleute verworfen haben	Sunday after Christmas	SATB with 2 hautois, 2 violins, viola, cello and continuo	—	Telemann Portal; Catalogue TWV
TVWV 1	TVWV 1:320	Der Tod ist verschlungen in den Sieg	Easter	SATB with 2 oboes, 2 bugles, timpani, 2 violins, viola, cello and continuo	—	Telemann Portal; Catalogue TWV
TVWV 1	TVWV 1:321	Der Tod ist verschlungen in den Sieg	Easter	—	Lost	Telemann Portal; Catalogue TWV
TVWV 1	TVWV 1:322	Der Tod ist verschlungen in den Sieg	3rd day of Easter	SATB with 2 oboes, 2 violins, viola, cello and continuo	—	Telemann Portal; Catalogue TWV
TVWV 1	TVWV 1:323	Der Tod ist verschlungen in den Sieg	Easter	SATTTTBB with 2 flutes, 3 bugles, timpani, 2 violins, viola, cello and continuo	—	Telemann Portal; Catalogue TWV
TVWV 1	TVWV 1:324	Der treue Freund, der unser Elend schaut	20th Sunday after Trinity	SATB with 2 flutes/oboe, 2 violins, viola, cello and continuo	—	Telemann Portal; Catalogue TWV
TVWV 1	TVWV 1:325	Der wahre Glaub und ein inbrünstiges	3rd Sunday of Lent	—	Lost	Telemann Portal; Catalogue TWV
TVWV 1	TVWV 1:326	Des Herren Zorn währet eine Weile	24th Sunday after Trinity	—	Lost	Telemann Portal; Catalogue TWV
TVWV 1	TVWV 1:327	Des Königs Tochter ist ganz herrlich	2nd Sunday after Epiphany	SATB with oboe, 2 violins, viola, cello and continuo	—	Telemann Portal; Catalogue TWV
TVWV 1	TVWV 1:327a	Des wutenden Meeres betaubendes Brausen	2nd Sunday of Advent	Solo voice with hunting horn, violin and continuo	Version	Catalogue TWV
TVWV 1	TVWV 1:328	Dich, den meine Seele	6th Sunday after Epiphany	Solo voice with 2 violins and continuo	—	Telemann Portal; Catalogue TWV
TVWV 1	TVWV 1:329	Dich rühmen die Welten	Feast of St. Michael	SATB with 2 oboes, 3 trumpets, timpani, 2 violins, viola and continuo	—	Telemann Portal; Catalogue TWV
TVWV 1	TVWV 1:330	Die auf den Herrn hoffen, die werden	3rd Sunday of Advent	—	See TVWV 7:8	Telemann Portal; Catalogue TWV
TVWV 1	TVWV 1:331	Die Bosheit siehet oft die größesten	6th Sunday after Trinity	SATB with 2 oboes, 2 violins, viola, cello and continuo	—	Telemann Portal; Catalogue TWV
TVWV 1	TVWV 1:332	Die Ehe soll ehrlich gehalten werden	2nd Sunday after Epiphany	SATB with 2 oboes, 2 violins, viola, cello and continuo	—	Telemann Portal; Catalogue TWV
TVWV 1	TVWV 1:333	Die Ehe soll ehrlich gehalten werden	2nd Sunday after Epiphany	SATB with 2 oboes, 2 violins, viola, cello and continuo	—	Telemann Portal; Catalogue TWV
TVWV 1	TVWV 1:334	Die Ehre des herrlichen Schöpfers zu melden	20th Sunday after Trinity	Solo voice with violin and continuo	—	Telemann Portal; Catalogue TWV
TVWV 1	TVWV 1:335	Die Engel sind allzumal dienstbare Geister	Feast of St. Michael	SATB with 2 violins and continuo	—	Telemann Portal; Catalogue TWV
TVWV 1	TVWV 1:336	Die Furcht des Herrn ist der rechte Gottesdienst	1st Sunday after Epiphany	SATB with 2 oboes, 2 violins, viola, cello and continuo	—	Telemann Portal; Catalogue TWV
TVWV 1	TVWV 1:337	Die Furcht des Herrn ist Ehre und Ruhm	Easter	SS(A)B with continuo	—	Telemann Portal; Catalogue TWV
TVWV 1	TVWV 1:338	Die G'bot all uns gegeben sind	Feast of Pentecost	SATB with 2 flutes, oboe, 2 violins, viola, cello and continuo	—	Telemann Portal; Catalogue TWV
TVWV 1	TVWV 1:338a	Die Glut des Zorns, das Feur	6th Sunday after Trinity	Solo voice with violin, cello/bassoon and continuo	Version	Catalogue TWV
TVWV 1	TVWV 1:339	Die Gnadentüre steht dir offen	1st Sunday after Trinity	Solo bass and SATB with 2 violins, viola, cello and continuo	—	Telemann Portal; Catalogue TWV
TVWV 1	TVWV 1:340	Die Gottesfürchtigen trösten sich	1st Sunday after Trinity	—	Lost	Telemann Portal; Catalogue TWV
TVWV 1	TVWV 1:341	Die Gottesgnad alleine	1st Sunday after Epiphany	SATB with oboe, 3 trumpets, timpani, 2 violins, viola, cello and continuo	—	Telemann Portal; Catalogue TWV
TVWV 1	TVWV 1:342	Die Gottlosen werden in die ewige Pein gehen	1st Sunday after Trinity	—	Lost	Telemann Portal; Catalogue TWV
TVWV 1	TVWV 1:343	Die Gottlosen ziehen das Schwert aus	Sunday After New Year's Eve	SATB with 2 oboes, 2 violins, viola, cello and continuo	—	Telemann Portal; Catalogue TWV
TVWV 1	TVWV 1:344	Die Gott vertrauen, die erfahren	25th Sunday after Trinity	SATB with 2 flutes/oboe, 2 violins, viola, cello and continuo	—	Telemann Portal; Catalogue TWV
TVWV 1	TVWV 1:345	Die Grube ist von gestern her zugerichtet	1st Sunday after Trinity	SATB with 2 oboes, 2 violins, viola, cello and continuo	—	Telemann Portal; Catalogue TWV
TVWV 1	TVWV 1:346	Die Güte des Herrn ist, dass wir nicht gar aus sind	Cantata for the Feast of Thanksgiving	SB with 2 violins, viola and continuo	—	Telemann Portal; Catalogue TWV
TVWV 1	TVWV 1:347	Die Hauptsumma des Gebots ist Liebe	18th Sunday after Trinity	SAB with 2 violins, viola and continuo	—	Telemann Portal; Catalogue TWV
TVWV 1	TVWV 1:348	Die ihm vertrauen	3rd Sunday of Advent	SAB with 2 violins, viola and continuo	—	Telemann Portal; Catalogue TWV
TVWV 1	TVWV 1:349	Die Kinder des Höchsten sind rufende Stimmen	Feast of St. John the Baptist	Solo voice with violin and continuo	—	Telemann Portal; Catalogue TWV
TVWV 1	TVWV 1:350	Die Liebe gegen meinen Gott	13th Sunday after Trinity	Bass solo and SATB with 2 flutes, 2 violins, viola and continuo	—	Telemann Portal; Catalogue TWV
TVWV 1	TVWV 1:351	Die Lust zur Sünde hüllt sich oft	3rd day of the feast of Pentecost	—	Lost	Telemann Portal; Catalogue TWV
TVWV 1	TVWV 1:352	Die mit Tränen säen, werden mit Freuden ernten	21st Sunday after Trinity	SB with 2 violins, cello and continuo	—	Telemann Portal; Catalogue TWV
TVWV 1	TVWV 1:353	Die Opfer, die Gott gefallen	Feast of the Epiphany	SATB with 2 oboes, 3 trumpets, timpani, 2 violins, viola, cello and continuo	—	Telemann Portal; Catalogue TWV
TVWV 1	TVWV 1:354	Diesen Tag hat Gott gemacht	1st Sunday after Advent	—	= TVWV 1:807	Telemann Portal; Catalogue TWV
TVWV 1	TVWV 1:355	Dieser Jesus, welcher von euch ist aufgenommen	Ascension Day	SATB with 2 oboes, 2 violins, viola, cello and continuo	—	Telemann Portal; Catalogue TWV
TVWV 1	TVWV 1:356	Dies ist der Gotteskinder Last	3rd Sunday after Easter	Solo voice with oboe and continuo	—	Telemann Portal; Catalogue TWV
TVWV 1	TVWV 1:357	Dies ist der Tag, den der Herr macht	2nd day of the feast of Pentecost	—	Lost	Telemann Portal; Catalogue TWV
TVWV 1	TVWV 1:358	Dies ist der Tag, den der Herr machet	Feast of the Assumption of Mary	—	Lost	Telemann Portal; Catalogue TWV
TVWV 1	TVWV 1:359	Dies ist der Tag, den der Herr macht	Feast of the Assumption of Mary	SAB with 2 violins, viola and continuo	—	Telemann Portal; Catalogue TWV
TVWV 1	TVWV 1:360	Dies ist der Tag, den der Herr machet	Feast of the Assumption of Mary	—	Lost	Telemann Portal; Catalogue TWV
TVWV 1	TVWV 1:361	Dies ist der Tag, den uns der Herr macht	Ascension Day	—	Lost	Telemann Portal; Catalogue TWV
TVWV 1	TVWV 1:362	Die, so ihr den Herrn fürchtet	4th Sunday after Epiphany	SATB with 2 oboes, 2 violins, viola, cello and continuo	—	Telemann Portal; Catalogue TWV
TVWV 1	TVWV 1:363	Die stärkende Wirkung des Geistes der Gnade	16th Sunday after Trinity	Solo voice with violin and continuo	—	Telemann Portal; Catalogue TWV
TVWV 1	TVWV 1:364	Die stille Nacht umschloss den Kreis der Erden	Miscellaneous cantatas	Solo bass with 2 flutes, 2 oboes, 2 violins, viola, cello and continuo	—	Telemann Portal; Catalogue TWV
TVWV 1	TVWV 1:365	Die Sünd hat uns verderbet sehr	Passion Sunday	SATB with 2 flutes/oboe, 2 violins, viola, cello and continuo	—	Telemann Portal; Catalogue TWV
TVWV 1	TVWV 1:366	Die Sünd macht Leid, Christus bringt Freud	Christmas Feast	SATB with piccolo, oboe, 3 trumpets, timpani, 2 violins, viola, cello and continuo	—	Telemann Portal; Catalogue TWV
TVWV 1	TVWV 1:367	Die Wahrheit fällt auf der Gasse	Passion Sunday	SATB with 2 oboes, bugle, 2 violins, viola, cello and continuo	—	Telemann Portal; Catalogue TWV
TVWV 1	TVWV 1:368	Die Wahrheit ist ein edles Kind	2nd day of the feast of Pentecost	SATB with 2 oboes, 2 violins, viola, cello and continuo	—	Telemann Portal; Catalogue TWV
TVWV 1	TVWV 1:369	Die Wahrheit ist ein himmlisch	Passion Sunday	—	Lost	Telemann Portal; Catalogue TWV
TVWV 1	TVWV 1:370	Die Weisheit ruft und keiner hört	2nd Sunday after Trinity	SATB with 2 flutes, 2 oboes, 2 violins, viola, cello and continuo	—	Telemann Portal; Catalogue TWV
TVWV 1	TVWV 1:371	Die Welt bekümmert sich	Sunday after Ascension Day	SATB with 2 oboes, 2 violins, viola, cello and continuo	—	Telemann Portal; Catalogue TWV
TVWV 1	TVWV 1:372	Die Welt kann ihre Lust	21st Sunday after Trinity	SATB with oboe, 2 violins, viola, cello and continuo	—	Telemann Portal; Catalogue TWV
TVWV 1	TVWV 1:373	Die Welt vergehet mit ihrer Lust	16th Sunday after Trinity	SATB with 2 flutes, oboe, 2 violins, viola, cello and continuo	—	Telemann Portal; Catalogue TWV
TVWV 1	TVWV 1:374	Drei sind, die da zeugen im Himmel	Feast of the Trinity	SATB with 2 bugles, 2 trombones, 2 violins, viola, cello and continuo	—	Telemann Portal; Catalogue TWV
TVWV 1	TVWV 1:375	Drei sind, die da zeugen im Himmel	Feast of the Trinity	SATB with 2 oboes, 2 bugles, 2 hunting horns, 2 violins, viola, cello and continuo	—	Telemann Portal; Catalogue TWV
TVWV 1	TVWV 1:376	Drei sind, die da zeugen im Himmel	Feast of the Trinity	SATB with 2 violins, viola, cello and continuo	—	Telemann Portal; Catalogue TWV
TVWV 1	TVWV 1:377	Drei sind, die da zeugen im Himmel	Feast of the Trinity	SATB with 2 oboes, 3 trumpets, timpani, 2 violins, viola, cello and continuo	—	Telemann Portal; Catalogue TWV
TVWV 1	TVWV 1:378	Drückt euch das schwere Joch der Sünden	11th Sunday after Trinity	—	—	Telemann Portal; Catalogue TWV
TVWV 1	TVWV 1:379	Du aber, was richtest du deinen Bruder	4th Sunday after Trinity	SATB with 2 oboes, 2 violins, viola, cello and continuo	—	Telemann Portal; Catalogue TWV
TVWV 1	TVWV 1:380	Du aber, was richtest du deinen Bruder	4th Sunday after Epiphany	—	Lost	Telemann Portal; Catalogue TWV
TVWV 1	TVWV 1:381	Du bereitest vor mir einen Tisch	Feast of St. Michael	—	Lost	Telemann Portal; Catalogue TWV
TVWV 1	TVWV 1:382	Du bist erschrecklich	22nd Sunday after Trinity	SATB with 2 oboes, 2 violins, viola, cello and continuo	—	Telemann Portal; Catalogue TWV
TVWV 1	TVWV 1:383	Du bist es, der mich tröst'	19th Sunday after Trinity	—	Lost	Telemann Portal; Catalogue TWV
TVWV 1	TVWV 1:383a	Du bist ja, hochbedrangte Liebe	18th Sunday after Trinity	Solo voice with violin, viola and continuo	Version	Catalogue TWV
TVWV 1	TVWV 1:384	Du bist mein Vater, ich dein Kind	Sunday after Christmas	Solo soprano and SATB with 2 violins, viola, cello and continuo	—	Telemann Portal; Catalogue TWV
TVWV 1	TVWV 1:384a	Du bist mir, schnodes Gut der	9th Sunday after Trinity	Solo voice with 2 flutes and continuo	Version	Catalogue TWV
TVWV 1	TVWV 1:385	Du bist verflucht, o Schreckensstimme	4th Sunday of Lent	Solo voice with recorder and continuo	—	Telemann Portal; Catalogue TWV
TVWV 1	TVWV 1:386	Dünke dich nicht weise sein	4th Sunday after Trinity	SATB with 2 oboes, 2 violins, viola, cello and continuo	—	Telemann Portal; Catalogue TWV
TVWV 1	TVWV 1:387	Du fährest mit Jauchzen und heller Posaune	Ascension Day	Solo voice with violin and continuo	—	Telemann Portal; Catalogue TWV
TVWV 1	TVWV 1:388	Du Friedefürst, Herr Jesu Christ	1st Sunday after Easter	—	Lost	Telemann Portal; Catalogue TWV
TVWV 1	TVWV 1:389	Du Gott, dem nichts ist verborgen	1st Sunday after Easter	SATB with 2 flutes/oboe, 2 violins, viola, cello and continuo	—	Telemann Portal; Catalogue TWV
TVWV 1	TVWV 1:390	Du heiliges Licht, edler Hort	2nd day of the feast of Pentecost	—	Lost	Telemann Portal; Catalogue TWV
TVWV 1	TVWV 1:391	Du Hirte Israel, höre	2nd Sunday after Easter	SATB with 2 oboes, 2 violins, viola, cello and continuo	—	Telemann Portal; Catalogue TWV
TVWV 1	TVWV 1:392	Du machst mir, strenger Tod	24th Sunday after Trinity	Solo voice with 2 oboes and continuo	—	Telemann Portal; Catalogue TWV
TVWV 1	TVWV 1:393	Du meine Seele, singe	Feast of Pentecost	—	Lost	Telemann Portal; Catalogue TWV
TVWV 1	TVWV 1:394	Du, o schnödes Weltgebäude	Choral cantata	—	—	Telemann Portal; Catalogue TWV
TVWV 1	TVWV 1:395	Durch Adams Fall ist ganz verderbt	12th Sunday after Trinity	SATB with oboe, 2 violins, viola, cello and continuo	—	Telemann Portal; Catalogue TWV
TVWV 1	TVWV 1:396	Durch Adams Fall ist ganz verderbt	19th Sunday after Trinity	Bass solo and SATB with 2 violins, viola and continuo	—	Telemann Portal; Catalogue TWV
TVWV 1	TVWV 1:397	Durch Christi Auferstehungskraft	3rd day of Easter	Solo tenor and SATB with 2 violins and continuo	—	Telemann Portal; Catalogue TWV
TVWV 1	TVWV 1:398	Durch Christum habt ihr gehöret	3rd day of the feast of Pentecost	SATB with 2 oboes, 2 violins, viola, cello and continuo	—	Telemann Portal; Catalogue TWV
TVWV 1	TVWV 1:399	Durchsuche dich, o stolzer Geist	11th Sunday after Trinity	Solo voice with recorder and continuo	—	Telemann Portal; Catalogue TWV
TVWV 1	TVWV 1:400	Durch tausende gekünzelte Ränke	1st Sunday of Lent	SATB with 2 oboes, 2 violins, viola, cello and continuo	—	Telemann Portal; Catalogue TWV
TVWV 1	TVWV 1:401	Durch Trauren und durch Plagen	New Year	SATB with 2 flutes, 2 trumpets, timpani, 2 violins, viola, cello and continuo	—	Telemann Portal; Catalogue TWV
TVWV 1	TVWV 1:402	Du riefest einst aus tiefsten Schlünden	Feast of Pentecost	SATB with 2 transverse flutes, oboe, 2 trumpets, timpani, 2 violins, viola, cello and continuo	—	Telemann Portal; Catalogue TWV
TVWV 1	TVWV 1:403	Du sollst lieben Gott, deinen Herrn	13th Sunday after Trinity	SATB with 2 oboes, 2 violins, viola, cello and continuo	—	Telemann Portal; Catalogue TWV
TVWV 1	TVWV 1:404	Du teure Liebe	18th Sunday after Trinity	SATB with 2 oboes, 2 violins, viola, cello and continuo	—	Telemann Portal; Catalogue TWV
TVWV 1	TVWV 1:405	Du Tochter Zion, freue dich sehr	1st Sunday after Advent	SATB with 2 oboes, 2 violins, viola, cello and continuo	—	Telemann Portal; Catalogue TWV
TVWV 1	TVWV 1:406	Du Tochter Zion, freue dich	1st Sunday after Advent	SATB with flute, 2 oboes, 2 horns, 2 violins, viola, cello and continuo	—	Telemann Portal; Catalogue TWV
TVWV 1	TVWV 1:407	Du Tochter Zion, freue dich sehr	1st Sunday after Advent	SATB with 3 trumpets, 2 violins, viola, cello and continuo	—	Telemann Portal; Catalogue TWV
TVWV 1	TVWV 1:408	Du Tochter Zion, freue dich sehr	1st Sunday after Advent	SATB with 2 horns, 2 violins, viola, cello and continuo	—	Telemann Portal; Catalogue TWV
TVWV 1	TVWV 1:409	Du unbegreiflich höchstes Gut	Feast of Pentecost	SATB with 2 oboes, 3 trumpets, timpani, 2 violins, viola, cello and continuo	—	Telemann Portal; Catalogue TWV
TVWV 1	TVWV 1:410	Edler Geist ins Himmels Trone	Choral cantata	SATB with 2 violins, viola, cello and continuo	—	Telemann Portal; Catalogue TWV
TVWV 1	TVWV 1:411	Ehre sei Gott in der Höhe	Christmas Feast	SATB with 2 flutes, 2 oboes, 2 trumpets, timpani, 2 violins, viola, cello and continuo	—	Telemann Portal; Catalogue TWV
TVWV 1	TVWV 1:412	Ehre sei Gott in der Höhe	Christmas Feast	SATB with 3 bugles, timpani, 2 violins, viola and continuo	—	Telemann Portal; Catalogue TWV
TVWV 1	TVWV 1:413	Ehr und Dank sei dir gesungen	Feast of St. Michael	Solo bass and SATB with 2 trumpets, timpani, 2 violins, viola, cello and continuo	—	Telemann Portal; Catalogue TWV
TVWV 1	TVWV 1:414	Eilt hinweg, verfolgte Sinnen	Sunday After New Year's Eve	SATB with 2 oboes, 2 violins, viola, cello and continuo	—	Telemann Portal; Catalogue TWV
TVWV 1	TVWV 1:415	Eilt zu, ruft laut, ihr längst verlangten Boten	1st Sunday after Advent	SAT,SAT with 2 transverse flutes, 2 oboes, 2 violins, viola and continuo	—	Telemann Portal; Catalogue TWV
TVWV 1	TVWV 1:416	Ein Arzt ist uns gegeben	3rd Sunday after Epiphany	Solo tenor and SATB with 2 violins, viola, cello and continuo	—	Telemann Portal; Catalogue TWV
TVWV 1	TVWV 1:417	Ein Aussatz ist die Sünde	14th Sunday after Trinity	SATB with 2 violins, viola, cello and continuo	—	Telemann Portal; Catalogue TWV
TVWV 1	TVWV 1:418	Einen solchen Hohenpriester	Passion Sunday	SATB with 2 oboes, 2 violins, viola, cello and continuo	—	Telemann Portal; Catalogue TWV
TVWV 1	TVWV 1:419	Ein feste Burg ist unser Gott	Choral cantata	Bass solo with violin and continuo	—	Telemann Portal; Catalogue TWV
TVWV 1	TVWV 1:420	Ein feste Burg ist unser Gott	Choral cantata	SATB with 3 bugles, timpani, 2 violins, viola and continuo	—	Telemann Portal; Catalogue TWV
TVWV 1	TVWV 1:421	Ein gläubiges Flehn in Jesu Namen	Rogation Festival	SATB with 2 oboes, 2 violins, viola, cello and continuo	—	Telemann Portal; Catalogue TWV
TVWV 1	TVWV 1:422	Ein gütiges Herz ist des Leibes Leben	4th Sunday after Trinity	SATB with 2 violins, cello and continuo	—	Telemann Portal; Catalogue TWV
TVWV 1	TVWV 1:422a	Ein heisser Durst nach	3rd Sunday after Easter	Solo voice with 2 flutes and continuo	Version	Catalogue TWV
TVWV 1	TVWV 1:422b	Ein Herz, mit seinem	Sunday after Ascension Day	Solo voice with violin, viola and continuo	Version	Catalogue TWV
TVWV 1	TVWV 1:423	Ein Jahr macht wiederum	New Year	—	Lost	Telemann Portal; Catalogue TWV
TVWV 1	TVWV 1:424	Ich bin so müde vom Seufzen	2nd Sunday after Epiphany	SATB with 2 oboes, 2 violins, viola, cello and continuo	—	Telemann Portal; Catalogue TWV
TVWV 1	TVWV 1:425	Ein jeder läuft, der in den Schranken läuft	Septuagesima Sunday	Solo voice with oboe and continuo	—	Telemann Portal; Catalogue TWV
TVWV 1	TVWV 1:426	Ein Kindelein so löbelich	2nd day of the Christmas festival	SATB with 2 violins, viola, cello and continuo	—	Telemann Portal; Catalogue TWV
TVWV 1	TVWV 1:427	Ein lispelnd murmelndes Gedränge	1st Sunday after Epiphany	SATB with 2 oboes, 2 violins, viola, cello and continuo	—	Telemann Portal; Catalogue TWV
TVWV 1	TVWV 1:428	Ein Mensch hält gegen den andern	6th Sunday after Trinity	—	Lost	Telemann Portal; Catalogue TWV
TVWV 1	TVWV 1:429	Ein Richter muss im Urteilsprechen	Sunday of Quinquagesima	SATB with 2 oboes, 2 violins, viola, cello and continuo	—	Telemann Portal; Catalogue TWV
TVWV 1	TVWV 1:430	Ein sanftes Erfreuen, ein ruhiges Ergetzten	Septuagesima Sunday	SATB with 2 oboes d'amore, 2 violins, viola and continuo	—	Telemann Portal; Catalogue TWV
TVWV 1	TVWV 1:431	Eins bitte ich vom Herren	1st Sunday after Epiphany	SATB with 2 oboes, 2 violins, viola, cello and continuo	—	Telemann Portal; Catalogue TWV
TVWV 1	TVWV 1:431a	Ein seliges Kind Gottes	4th Sunday after Trinity	Solo voice with oboe, violin and continuo	Version	Catalogue TWV
TVWV 1	TVWV 1:432	Ei nun, mein lieber Jesu	6th Sunday after Epiphany	Solo viola and SATB with 2 violins, viola, cello and continuo	—	Telemann Portal; Catalogue TWV
TVWV 1	TVWV 1:433	Eins ist not, ach Herr, dies eine	2nd Sunday after Trinity	Bass solo and SATB with 2 violins, viola and continuo	—	Telemann Portal; Catalogue TWV
TVWV 1	TVWV 1:434	Ein ungefärbt Gemüte	4th Sunday after Trinity	SATB with 2 oboes, 2 horns, 2 violins, 2 violas and continuo	—	Telemann Portal; Catalogue TWV
TVWV 1	TVWV 1:435	Ein Weiser rühme sich nicht seiner Weisheit	4th Sunday of Advent	SATB with 2 oboes, 2 violins, viola, cello and continuo	—	Telemann Portal; Catalogue TWV
TVWV 1	TVWV 1:436	Ein zartes Kind hat nirgends größ're Lust	25th Sunday after Trinity	Solo voice with violin and basso continuo	—	Telemann Portal; Catalogue TWV
TVWV 1	TVWV 1:437	Ei, warum sollt ich dich lassen	1st Sunday after Epiphany	Solo soprano and SATB with 2 violins, viola, cello and continuo	—	Telemann Portal; Catalogue TWV
TVWV 1	TVWV 1:438	Elend, Trübsal, Blut und Mord	Sunday after Ascension Day	—	Lost	Telemann Portal; Catalogue TWV
TVWV 1	TVWV 1:439	Empfindest du dein Elend nicht	12th Sunday after Trinity	—	Lost	Telemann Portal; Catalogue TWV
TVWV 1	TVWV 1:440	Endlich wird die Stunde schlagen	2nd Sunday of Advent	Solo voice with oboe and continuo	—	Telemann Portal; Catalogue TWV
TVWV 1	TVWV 1:440a	Engel, Menschen, Himmel	Feast of St-Jean-Baptiste	Solo voice with violin, viola and continuo	Version	Catalogue TWV
TVWV 1	TVWV 1:441	Entziehe, meine Seele, dich	1st Sunday after Trinity	—	Lost	Telemann Portal; Catalogue TWV
TVWV 1	TVWV 1:442	Entzückende Lust, unendliche Freuden	Choral cantata for communion	Solo viola with 2 violins, viola da gamba, viola, cello and continuo	—	Telemann Portal; Catalogue TWV
TVWV 1	TVWV 1:443	Erbarm dich mein, o Herre Gott	22nd Sunday after Trinity	SATB with 2 oboes, 2 violins, viola, cello and continuo	—	Telemann Portal; Catalogue TWV
TVWV 1	TVWV 1:444	Er, der Herr des Friedens	3rd day of Easter	SATB with 2 oboes, 2 violins, viola, cello and continuo	—	Telemann Portal; Catalogue TWV
TVWV 1	TVWV 1:445	Er, der Messias, ist ein Stein des Anstoßens	Sunday after Christmas	SATB with 2 oboes, 2 violins, viola, cello and continuo	—	Telemann Portal; Catalogue TWV
TVWV 1	TVWV 1:446	Erdulde die Dornen der plagenden Zeiten	3rd Sunday of Advent	—	= TVWV 1:1395	Telemann Portal; Catalogue TWV
TVWV 1	TVWV 1:446a	Er freur dich, Gewissen	1st Sunday after Easter	Solo voice with violin, viola and continuo	Version	Catalogue TWV
TVWV 1	TVWV 1:447	Ergeuß dich zur Salbung der schmachtenden Seele	3rd day of the feast of Pentecost	Solo voice with violin and continuo	—	Telemann Portal; Catalogue TWV
TVWV 1	TVWV 1:448	Ergötzt euch nur, ihr eitlen Seelen	2nd Sunday after Easter	SATB with flute, concertante oboe, bassoon oboe, 2 violins, viola, cello and continuo	—	Telemann Portal; Catalogue TWV
TVWV 1	TVWV 1:449	Erhalte mich, o Herr, in deinem Werke!	22nd Sunday after Trinity	Solo voice with flute and continuo	—	Telemann Portal; Catalogue TWV
TVWV 1	TVWV 1:450	Erhalt mein Herz im Glauben	1st Sunday after Easter	SATB with 2 violins, viola, cello and continuo	—	Telemann Portal; Catalogue TWV
TVWV 1	TVWV 1:451	Erhalt uns, Herr, bei deinem Wort	8th Sunday after Trinity	SATB with 2 oboes, 2 violins, viola, cello and continuo	—	Telemann Portal; Catalogue TWV
TVWV 1	TVWV 1:452	Er hat alles wohl gemacht	12th Sunday after Trinity	SAB with 2 violins, viola and continuo	—	Telemann Portal; Catalogue TWV
TVWV 1	TVWV 1:453	Er hat ein Gedächtnis gestiftet	3rd Sunday of Lent	SATB with oboe, 2 violins, viola, cello and continuo	—	Telemann Portal; Catalogue TWV
TVWV 1	TVWV 1:454	Erhebe dich, steig zu mir zu	Feast of the Trinity	—	Lost	Telemann Portal; Catalogue TWV
TVWV 1	TVWV 1:455	Erhebet den Herrn, unsern Gott	Miscellaneous cantatas	SATB with 2 oboes, 3 trumpets, timpani, 2 violins, viola, cello and continuo	—	Telemann Portal; Catalogue TWV
TVWV 1	TVWV 1:456	Erhebt euch, ihr Christen	Feast of the Assumption of Mary	—	Lost	Telemann Portal; Catalogue TWV
TVWV 1	TVWV 1:457	Erhebt euch, weil Christus gen Himmel gefahren	Ascension Day	SATB with 2 oboes, 2 violins, viola, cello and continuo	—	Telemann Portal; Catalogue TWV
TVWV 1	TVWV 1:458	Halleluja, erhöhet die Täler	4th Sunday of Advent	SATB with 2 violins, viola, cello and continuo	= TVWV 1:126	Telemann Portal; Catalogue TWV
TVWV 1	TVWV 1:459	Erhöre mich, wenn ich rufe	Rogation Festival	SATB with 2 oboes, cornet, 3 trombones, 2 violins, viola, cello and continuo	—	Telemann Portal; Catalogue TWV
TVWV 1	TVWV 1:460	Er ist auferstanden	Easter	TB solo with 2 piccolo bugles, 2 violins and continuo	—	Telemann Portal; Catalogue TWV
TVWV 1	TVWV 1:461	Er ist mein und ich bin sein	3rd day of the feast of Pentecost	Solo viola and SATB with 2 violins, viola, cello and continuo	—	Telemann Portal; Catalogue TWV
TVWV 1	TVWV 1:462	Er kam, lobsingt ihm	Ascension Day	SATB with flute, oboe, 3 trumpets, timpani, 2 violins, viola, cello and continuo	—	Telemann Portal; Catalogue TWV
TVWV 1	TVWV 1:463	Erkennet, dass der Herr Gott ist	3rd day of the feast of Pentecost	—	Lost	Telemann Portal; Catalogue TWV
TVWV 1	TVWV 1:464	Er kennt die rechten Freudenstunden	2nd Sunday after Epiphany	Solo viola and SATB with 2 violins, viola, cello and continuo	—	Telemann Portal; Catalogue TWV
TVWV 1	TVWV 1:465	Erkenntliche Christen, frohlocket und lachet	3rd day of the feast of Pentecost	SATB with 2 oboes, 2 violins, viola, cello and continuo	—	Telemann Portal; Catalogue TWV
TVWV 1	TVWV 1:465a	Erleuchte uns, wesentliche	Rogation Festival	Solo voice with violin, viola and continuo	Version	Catalogue TWV
TVWV 1	TVWV 1:466	Ermuntert euch, bestürzte Sinnen	2nd day of Easter	SATB with 2 oboes, 2 violins, viola, cello and continuo	—	Telemann Portal; Catalogue TWV
TVWV 1	TVWV 1:466a	Ermuntre dich, mein schwacher Geist	Feast of the Epiphany	Soprano solo and SATB with 2 violins, cello and continuo	Version	Catalogue TWV
TVWV 1	TVWV 1:467	Er neigte den Himmel	Ascension Day	SATB with oboe, 3 trumpets, timpani, 2 violins, viola, cello and continuo	—	Telemann Portal; Catalogue TWV
TVWV 1	TVWV 1:468	Eröffne dich, du Reich der Seligkeiten	Ascension Day	SATB with oboe, 3 trumpets, timpani, 2 violins, viola, cello and continuo	—	Telemann Portal; Catalogue TWV
TVWV 1	TVWV 1:469	Erquickendes Wunder der ewigen Gnade	Christmas Feast	Solo voice with violin and continuo	—	Telemann Portal; Catalogue TWV
TVWV 1	TVWV 1:470	Erquicktes Herz, sei voller Freude	2nd day of the Christmas festival	Solo bass with bassoon, violin, cello and continuo	—	Telemann Portal; Catalogue TWV
TVWV 1	TVWV 1:471	Erscheine, Gott, in deinem Tempel	Feast of the Purification of Mary	Solo voice with flute and continuo	—	Telemann Portal; Catalogue TWV
TVWV 1	TVWV 1:472	Erschrick, im Geiz versenkter Sünder	9th Sunday after Trinity	SATB with 2 oboes, 2 violins, viola, cello and continuo	—	Telemann Portal; Catalogue TWV
TVWV 1	TVWV 1:473	Erschrick, mein Herz, vor dir	14th Sunday after Trinity	Solo bass and SATB with 2 violins, viola, cello and continuo	—	Telemann Portal; Catalogue TWV
TVWV 1	TVWV 1:474	Erstanden ist der heilige Christ	Easter	SATB with oboe, bassoon, 2 trumpets, timpani, 2 violins, viola, cello and continuo	—	Telemann Portal; Catalogue TWV
TVWV 1	TVWV 1:475	Erster Anfang, letztes Ende	4th Sunday of Advent	SATB with 2 violins, viola, cello and continuo	—	Telemann Portal; Catalogue TWV
TVWV 1	TVWV 1:476	Ertönet bald herrlich, ihr letzten Posaunen	2nd Sunday of Advent	SATB with oboe, horn, trumpet, 2 violins, viola, cello and continuo	—	Telemann Portal; Catalogue TWV
TVWV 1	TVWV 1:477	Ertönet vom Jubel, ihr heiligen Hallen	Sunday after Christmas	—	= TVWV 1:566	Telemann Portal; Catalogue TWV
TVWV 1	TVWV 1:478	Ertönt, ihr Hütten der Gerechten	Miscellaneous cantatas	—	—	Telemann Portal; Catalogue TWV
TVWV 1	TVWV 1:479	Ertrage nur das Joch der Mängel	1st Sunday after Trinity	SATB with 2 oboes, 2 violins, viola, cello and continuo	—	Telemann Portal; Catalogue TWV
TVWV 1	TVWV 1:480	Erwachet, entreißt euch den sündlichen Träumen!	Sunday after Ascension Day	Solo voice with violin and continuo	—	Telemann Portal; Catalogue TWV
TVWV 1	TVWV 1:481	Erwachet zum Kriegen	1st Sunday after Advent	Solo voice with violin and continuo	—	Telemann Portal; Catalogue TWV
TVWV 1	TVWV 1:481a	Erwacht aus eurem Sorgen	15th Sunday after Trinity	Solo voice with 2 violins and continuo	Version	Catalogue TWV
TVWV 1	TVWV 1:482	Erwecke dich, Herr, warum schläfest du?	4th Sunday after Epiphany	SATB with 2 oboes 2 violins, viola, cello and continuo	—	Telemann Portal; Catalogue TWV
TVWV 1	TVWV 1:482a	Erweche dich, mein	3rd Sunday of Advent	Solo voice with violin, viola and continuo	Version	Catalogue TWV
TVWV 1	TVWV 1:483	Erweiche dich, du steinern Herze	Sunday of Sexagesima	—	Lost	Telemann Portal; Catalogue TWV
TVWV 1	TVWV 1:484	Er wird trinken vom Bach auf dem Wege	2nd day of Easter	SSAATTBBB with 2 flutes, 2 oboes, 3 bugles, timpani, 2 violins, viola and continuo	—	Telemann Portal; Catalogue TWV
TVWV 1	TVWV 1:485	Erzittre, Welt, vor dem Gericht	2nd Sunday of Advent	SATB with 2 violins, viola, cello and continuo	—	Telemann Portal; Catalogue TWV
TVWV 1	TVWV 1:486	Es danken dir, Gott, die Völker	Sunday of Sexagesima	SATB with oboe, 2 violins, viola, cello and continuo	—	Telemann Portal; Catalogue TWV
TVWV 1	TVWV 1:487	Es erhub sich ein Streit im Himmel	Feast of St. Michael	SATB with 2 bugles, 2 violins, viola, cello and continuo	—	Telemann Portal; Catalogue TWV
TVWV 1	TVWV 1:487b	Erwag, o Mensch, sechs ganze Tage	17th Sunday after Trinity	Solo voice with 2 flutes and continuo	Version	Catalogue TWV
TVWV 1	TVWV 1:488	Es erhub sich ein Streit im Himmel	Feast of St. Michael	SATB with oboe, horn, 2 violins, viola, cello and continuo	—	Telemann Portal; Catalogue TWV
TVWV 1	TVWV 1:489	Es fähret Jesus auf mit Jauchzen	Ascension Day	SATB with 2 oboes, 3 trumpets, timpani, 2 violins, viola, cello and continuo	—	Telemann Portal; Catalogue TWV
TVWV 1	TVWV 1:490	Es fliehet das Jahr auf Adelers Flügeln	New Year	—	Lost	Telemann Portal; Catalogue TWV
TVWV 1	TVWV 1:490a	Es fullen der Allmacht	10th Sunday after Trinity	Solo voice with 2 violins and continuo	Version	Catalogue TWV
TVWV 1	TVWV 1:491	Es gleitet mein Fuß auf schlüpfrigen Wegen	1st Sunday after Epiphany	SATB,SATB with 2 violins, viola and continuo	—	Telemann Portal; Catalogue TWV
TVWV 1	TVWV 1:492	Es hat mich umgeben Leiden ohne Zahl	12th Sunday after Trinity	SATB with 2 oboes, 2 violins, viola, cello and continuo	—	Telemann Portal; Catalogue TWV
TVWV 1	TVWV 1:493	Es heißt, was wir von Gott nur bitten	Rogation Festival	—	Lost	Telemann Portal; Catalogue TWV
TVWV 1	TVWV 1:494	Es ist das Heil uns kommen her	Septuagesima Sunday	SATB with 2 oboes, 2 violins, viola, cello and continuo	—	Telemann Portal; Catalogue TWV
TVWV 1	TVWV 1:495	Es ist das Herz ein trotzig und verzagt Ding	19th Sunday after Trinity	SATB with 2 oboes, 2 violins, viola, cello and continuo	—	Telemann Portal; Catalogue TWV
TVWV 1	TVWV 1:496	Es ist dir gesagt, Mensch, was gut ist	5th Sunday after Trinity	SATB with 2 oboes, 2 violins, viola, cello and continuo	—	Telemann Portal; Catalogue TWV
TVWV 1	TVWV 1:497	Es ist dir gesagt, Mensch, was gut ist	17th Sunday after Trinity	SAB with 2 violins, viola and continuo	—	Telemann Portal; Catalogue TWV
TVWV 1	TVWV 1:498	Es ist ein elend jämmerlich Ding	16th Sunday after Trinity	SATB with 2 oboes, 2 violins, viola, cello and continuo	—	Telemann Portal; Catalogue TWV
TVWV 1	TVWV 1:499	Es ist eine Stimme eines Predigers	Feast of St. John the Baptist	SATB with 2 flutes, oboe, 2 violins, viola, cello and continuo	—	Telemann Portal; Catalogue TWV
TVWV 1	TVWV 1:500	Es ist ein Gott und ein Mittler	2nd day of the feast of Pentecost	SATB with 2 oboes, 2 violins, viola, cello and continuo	—	Telemann Portal; Catalogue TWV
TVWV 1	TVWV 1:501	Es ist ein großer Gewinn, wer gottselig ist	Septuagesima Sunday	SATB with 2 violins, viola, cello, double bass and continuo	—	Telemann Portal; Catalogue TWV
TVWV 1	TVWV 1:502	Es ist ein großer Gewinn, wer gottselig ist	13th Sunday after Trinity	SATB with 2 oboes, 2 violins, viola, cello and continuo	—	Telemann Portal; Catalogue TWV
TVWV 1	TVWV 1:503	Es ist ein großer Gewinn	7th Sunday after Trinity	SATB with 2 oboes, 2 violins, viola, cello and continuo	—	Telemann Portal; Catalogue TWV
TVWV 1	TVWV 1:504	Es ist ein köstlich Ding	3rd Sunday after Easter	SATB with 2 oboes, 2 violins, viola, cello and continuo	—	Telemann Portal; Catalogue TWV
TVWV 1	TVWV 1:506	Es ist ein schlechter Ruhm	19th Sunday after Trinity	Solo voice with recorder and continuo	—	Telemann Portal; Catalogue TWV
TVWV 1	TVWV 1:507	Es ist erschienen die heilsame Gnade Gottes	Christmas Feast	SATB with 2 flutes/oboe, 2 violins, viola, cello and continuo	—	Telemann Portal; Catalogue TWV
TVWV 1	TVWV 1:508	Es ist erschienen die heilsame Gnade	Feast of the Assumption of Mary	SATB with 2 oboes, 2 violins, viola, cello and continuo	—	Telemann Portal; Catalogue TWV
TVWV 1	TVWV 1:509	Es ist gewisslich an der Zeit	25th Sunday after Trinity	Solo tenor and SATB with 2 violins, cello and continuo	—	Telemann Portal; Catalogue TWV
TVWV 1	TVWV 1:510	Es ist gewisslich an der Zeit	2nd Sunday of Advent	SATB with 2 bugles, 2 violins, viola and continuo	—	Telemann Portal; Catalogue TWV
TVWV 1	TVWV 1:511	Es ist gewisslich an der Zeit	25th Sunday after Trinity	SA solo with 2 violins, cello and continuo	—	Telemann Portal; Catalogue TWV
TVWV 1	TVWV 1:512	Es ist gut, auf den Herrn vertrauen	21st Sunday after Trinity	SATB with 2 oboes, 2 violins, viola, cello and continuo	—	Telemann Portal; Catalogue TWV
TVWV 1	TVWV 1:513	Es ist keine Obrigkeit ohne von Gott	23rd Sunday after Trinity	SATB with 2 oboes, 2 violins, viola, cello and continuo	—	Telemann Portal; Catalogue TWV
TVWV 1	TVWV 1:514	Es ist um aller Menschen Leben	14th Sunday after Trinity	SATB with 2 oboes, 2 violins, viola, cello and continuo	—	Telemann Portal; Catalogue TWV
TVWV 1	TVWV 1:515	Es ist umsonst, dass ihr früh aufsteht	5th Sunday after Trinity	SATB with 2 oboes, bassoon, 2 violins, viola, cello, double bass and continuo	—	Telemann Portal; Catalogue TWV
TVWV 1	TVWV 1:516	Es ist umsonst, dass ihr früh aufsteht	5th Sunday after Trinity	SATB with 2 oboes, 2 violins, viola, cello and continuo	—	Telemann Portal; Catalogue TWV
TVWV 1	TVWV 1:517	Es jauchzen die Engel entzückende Lieder	Christmas Feast	SATB with 2 transverse flutes, oboe, 2 trumpets, timpani, 2 violins, viola, cello and continuo	—	Telemann Portal; Catalogue TWV
TVWV 1	TVWV 1:518	Es kann nicht anders sein	3rd Sunday after Easter	SATB with 2 oboes, 2 violins, viola, cello and continuo	—	Telemann Portal; Catalogue TWV
TVWV 1	TVWV 1:518a	Es klinget oft klaglich nach	2nd Sunday of Lent	Solo voice with violin, viola and continuo	Version	Catalogue TWV
TVWV 1	TVWV 1:519	Es komm mein End heut oder morgen	Feast of the Purification of Mary	SATB with recorder, 2 flutes, oboe, 2 violins, viola, cello and continuo	—	Telemann Portal; Catalogue TWV
TVWV 1	TVWV 1:520	Es kommet die Stunde	26th Sunday after Trinity	SATB with 2 oboes, 2 violins, viola, cello and continuo	—	Telemann Portal; Catalogue TWV
TVWV 1	TVWV 1:521	Es kommt die Zeit heran, ich soll	Ascension Day	SATTBB with flute, 3 bugles, timpani, 2 violins, viola and continuo	—	Telemann Portal; Catalogue TWV
TVWV 1	TVWV 1:522	Es kommt die Stunde	26th Sunday after Trinity	SATB with 2 violins, viola, cello and continuo	—	Telemann Portal; Catalogue TWV
TVWV 1	TVWV 1:523	Es lebt so mancher Mensch in Sünde	2nd Sunday of Advent	—	Lost	Telemann Portal; Catalogue TWV
TVWV 1	TVWV 1:524	Es sei denn, dass jemand geboren werde	4th Sunday of Advent	SATB with 2 oboes, 2 violins, viola, cello and continuo	—	Telemann Portal; Catalogue TWV
TVWV 1	TVWV 1:525	Es sei denn, dass jemand von neuem geboren werde	Feast of the Trinity	—	Lost	Telemann Portal; Catalogue TWV
TVWV 1	TVWV 1:526	Es sei ferne von mir rühmen	Palm Sunday	SATB with flute, 2 oboes, 2 violins, viola, cello and continuo	—	Telemann Portal; Catalogue TWV
TVWV 1	TVWV 1:527	Es sind mancherlei Gaben	Feast of Pentecost	SATB with 2 oboes, 2 violins, viola, cello and continuo	—	Telemann Portal; Catalogue TWV
TVWV 1	TVWV 1:528	Es sind schon die letzten Zeiten	2nd Sunday of Advent	Solo bass and SATB with 2 violins, viola, cello and continuo	—	Telemann Portal; Catalogue TWV
TVWV 1	TVWV 1:529	Es sind schon die letzten Zeiten	25th Sunday after Trinity	Solo bass with oboe, 2 violins, viola and continuo	—	Telemann Portal; Catalogue TWV
TVWV 1	TVWV 1:530	Es soll auf diesen Tag niemand sterben	Feast of the Assumption of Mary	SATB with 2 violins, viola, cello and continuo	—	Telemann Portal; Catalogue TWV
TVWV 1	TVWV 1:531	Es spielen die Strahlen der göttlichen Stärke	12th Sunday after Trinity	SATB with 2 flutes/oboe, 2 violins, viola, cello and continuo	—	Telemann Portal; Catalogue TWV
TVWV 1	TVWV 1:532	Es spricht, der solches zeuget	2nd Sunday of Advent	SAB with 2 violins, viola and continuo	= TVWV 10:16	Telemann Portal; Catalogue TWV
TVWV 1	TVWV 1:533	Es spricht der Unweisen Mund	8th Sunday after Trinity	SATB with 2 oboes, 2 violins, viola, cello and continuoSome tunes have alternative versions.	—	Telemann Portal; Catalogue TWV
TVWV 1	TVWV 1:534	Es werde geschrieben auf die Nachkommen	25th Sunday after Trinity	—	= TVWV 2:1b	Telemann Portal; Catalogue TWV
TVWV 1	TVWV 1:535	Es werden nicht alle, die zu mir sagen	8th Sunday after Trinity	SATB with 2 oboes, 2 violins, viola, cello and continuo	—	Telemann Portal; Catalogue TWV
TVWV 1	TVWV 1:536	Es werden sich viele falsche Propheten erheben	25th Sunday after Trinity	SATB with 2 oboes, 2 violins, viola, cello and continuo	—	Telemann Portal; Catalogue TWV
TVWV 1	TVWV 1:537	Es wird des Herrn Tag kommen	26th Sunday after Trinity	SATB with 2 oboes, 2 violins, viola, cello and continuo	—	Telemann Portal; Catalogue TWV
TVWV 1	TVWV 1:538	Es wird des Herrn Tag kommen	27th Sunday after Trinity	SATB with recorder, 2 oboes, 2 violins, viola, cello and continuo	—	Telemann Portal; Catalogue TWV
TVWV 1	TVWV 1:539	Es wird ein Durchbrecher vor ihnen herauf fahren	Easter	SATB with 2 oboes, 3 trumpets, timpani, 2 violins, viola, cello and continuo	—	Telemann Portal; Catalogue TWV
TVWV 1	TVWV 1:540	Es wird ein Schwert durch deine Seele dringen	Christmas Feast	—	Lost	Telemann Portal; Catalogue TWV
TVWV 1	TVWV 1:541	Es wird ein Tag sein	25th Sunday after Trinity	SATB with flute, oboe, 2 violins, viola, cello and continuo	= TVWV 1:169	Telemann Portal; Catalogue TWV
TVWV 1	TVWV 1:542	Es wird ein unbarmherzig Gericht	1st Sunday after Trinity	SATB with 2 oboes, 2 violins, viola, cello, double bass and continuo	—	Telemann Portal; Catalogue TWV
TVWV 1	TVWV 1:543	Es wird geschehen, dass des Menschen Sohn	26th Sunday after Trinity	SATB with 2 oboes, 2 violins, viola, cello and continuo	—	Telemann Portal; Catalogue TWV
TVWV 1	TVWV 1:544	Es wollt uns Gott genädig sein	14th Sunday after Trinity	SATB with 2 oboes, 2 violins, viola, cello and continuo	—	Telemann Portal; Catalogue TWV
TVWV 1	TVWV 1:544a	Euch wackelhafte Hoffartsberge	1st Sunday After Lent	Solo voice with 2 violins, viola and continuo	Version	Catalogue TWV
TVWV 1	TVWV 1:545	Euch zuvörderst hat Gott auferwecket	10th Sunday after Trinity	SATB with 2 violins, viola, cello and continuo	—	Telemann Portal; Catalogue TWV
TVWV 1	TVWV 1:546	Ew'ge Quelle, milder Strom	4th Sunday after Easter	Solo voice with flute and continuo	—	Telemann Portal; Catalogue TWV
TVWV 1	TVWV 1:547	Feiert, Kinder des Höchsten	Feast of Pentecost	SATB with 2 flutes, 2 oboes, 2 trumpets, timpani, 2 violins, viola, cello and continuo	—	Telemann Portal; Catalogue TWV
TVWV 1	TVWV 1:547a	Feinde, berst vor Grimm	Sunday After New Year's Eve	Solo voice with violin, viola and continuo	Version	Catalogue TWV
TVWV 1	TVWV 1:548	Findet nun im Grabe Ruh	Miscellaneous cantatas	SATB with 2 violins, viola, cello and continuo	—	Telemann Portal; Catalogue TWV
TVWV 1	TVWV 1:549	Fleuch der Lüste Zauberauen	1st Sunday of Lent	Solo voice with violin and continuo	—	Telemann Portal; Catalogue TWV
TVWV 1	TVWV 1:550	Fleuch die Luste deiner Jugend	Sunday After New Year's Eve	SSATBB with 2 violins, viola and continuo	—	Telemann Portal; Catalogue TWV
TVWV 1	TVWV 1:551	Fleuch, fleuch die Lüste deiner Jugend	Sunday After New Year's Eve	—	Lost	Telemann Portal; Catalogue TWV
TVWV 1	TVWV 1:552	Flügel her, nur Flügel her	Feast of the Purification of Mary	SATB with flute, oboe, horn, 2 violins, viola, cello and continuo	—	Telemann Portal; Catalogue TWV
TVWV 1	TVWV 1:553	Fraget nicht, was mich betrübet	1st Sunday after Epiphany	SATB with oboe, 2 violins, viola, cello and continuo	—	Telemann Portal; Catalogue TWV
TVWV 1	TVWV 1:554	Fragst du, Jesu, was ich liebe	Choral cantata for communion	Solo bass with 2 violins, cello and continuo	—	Telemann Portal; Catalogue TWV
TVWV 1	TVWV 1:554a	Freud und Hoffnung sind	2nd day of Easter	Solo voice with violin, viola and continuo	Version	Catalogue TWV
TVWV 1	TVWV 1:555	Freu dich sehr, o meine Seele	16th Sunday after Trinity	SATB with flute, 2 oboes, 2 violins, viola, cello and continuo	—	Telemann Portal; Catalogue TWV
TVWV 1	TVWV 1:556	Freuet euch des Herrn, ihr Gerechten	8th Sunday after Trinity	—	Lost	Telemann Portal; Catalogue TWV
TVWV 1	TVWV 1:557	Freuet euch, die ihr mit Christo leidet	2nd day of the Christmas festival	SAB with 2 violins, viola and continuo	—	Telemann Portal; Catalogue TWV
TVWV 1	TVWV 1:558	Freuet euch, ihr Himmel	Feast of St. Michael	SSATB with flute, 2 trumpets, timpani, 2 violins, viola, cello and continuo	—	Telemann Portal; Catalogue TWV
TVWV 1	TVWV 1:559	Freuet euch mit Jerusalem	Easter	SATB with 2 flutes, 2 oboes, 2 tormpettes, timpani, 2 violins, viola, cello and continuo	—	Telemann Portal; Catalogue TWV
TVWV 1	TVWV 1:560	Freut euch, ihr Christen alle	2nd day of the feast of Pentecost	—	Lost	Telemann Portal; Catalogue TWV
TVWV 1	TVWV 1:561	Friede, Friede! Jesus lebt	1st Sunday after Easter	SATB with 2 oboes, 2 violins, viola, cello and continuo	—	Telemann Portal; Catalogue TWV
TVWV 1	TVWV 1:562	Friede sei mit euch	1st Sunday after Easter	—	Lost	Telemann Portal; Catalogue TWV
TVWV 1	TVWV 1:563	Frohlocket, erleuchtete Knechte des Höchsten	10th Sunday after Trinity	—	Lost	Telemann Portal; Catalogue TWV
TVWV 1	TVWV 1:564	Frohlocket, ihr Engel, und jauchzet	Ascension Day	SATB with 2 flutes, 2 oboes, 2 trumpets, timpani, 2 violins, viola, cello and continuo	—	Telemann Portal; Catalogue TWV
TVWV 1	TVWV 1:565	Frohlocket, ihr Völker	Ascension Day	SATB with 2 oboes, 2 horns, 2 trumpets, timpani, 2 violins, viola, cello and continuo	—	Telemann Portal; Catalogue TWV
TVWV 1	TVWV 1:566	Frohlocket mit Herzen	Sunday after Christmas	—	Lost	Catalogue TWV
TVWV 1	TVWV 1:567	Frohlocket und jauchzet, ihr Frommen	Christmas Feast	SATB with bugle, timpani, 2 violins, viola, cello and continuo	—	Telemann Portal; Catalogue TWV
TVWV 1	TVWV 1:568	Frohlocket vor Freuden	3rd day of Christmas	SATB with 2 oboes, 2 bugles, timpani, 2 violins, viola, cello and continuo	—	Telemann Portal; Catalogue TWV
TVWV 1	TVWV 1:569	Fürchte dich nicht, du kleine Herde	Sunday after Ascension Day	—	Lost	Telemann Portal; Catalogue TWV
TVWV 1	TVWV 1:570	Fürchtet den Herrn, ihr seine Heiligen	15th Sunday after Trinity	SATB with 2 oboes, 2 violins, viola, cello and continuo	—	Telemann Portal; Catalogue TWV
TVWV 1	TVWV 1:571	Fürchtet den Herrn, ihr seine Heiligen	4th Sunday of Lent	SATB with flute, 2 oboes, 2 violins, viola, cello and continuo	—	Telemann Portal; Catalogue TWV
TVWV 1	TVWV 1:572	Fürchtet euch nicht für denen	Sunday after Ascension Day	SATB with 2 oboes, 2 violins, viola, cello and continuo	—	Telemann Portal; Catalogue TWV
TVWV 1	TVWV 1:573	Fürchtet Gott, ehret den König	23rd Sunday after Trinity	SATB with 2 oboes, 2 violins, viola, cello and continuo	—	Telemann Portal; Catalogue TWV
TVWV 1	TVWV 1:574	Für Schmeicheln, List und Heuchelei	8th Sunday after Trinity	Bass solo and SATB with 2 oboes, 2 violins, viola and continuo	—	Telemann Portal; Catalogue TWV
TVWV 1	TVWV 1:575	Fürwahr, er (der Herr Messias) trug unsere Krankheit	Palm Sunday	SATB with 2 oboes, 2 violins, viola, cello and continuo	—	Telemann Portal; Catalogue TWV
TVWV 1	TVWV 1:576	Fürwahr, er trug unsre Krankheit	Sunday of Sexagesima	SATB with 2 flutes, 2 violins, viola, cello and continuo	—	Telemann Portal; Catalogue TWV
TVWV 1	TVWV 1:577	Furcht und Zittern kommt mich an	Choral cantata for communion	SATB with flute, concertante oboe, 2 oboes, 2 violins, viola, cello and continuo	—	Telemann Portal; Catalogue TWV
TVWV 1	TVWV 1:578	Gebet dem Kaiser, was des Kaisers ist	23rd Sunday after Trinity	SATB with 2 oboes, 2 violins, viola, cello and continuo	—	Telemann Portal; Catalogue TWV
TVWV 1	TVWV 1:578a	Gebenedeites Weibersamen	New Year	Solo voice with violin, viola and continuo	Version	Catalogue TWV
TVWV 1	TVWV 1:579	Gebet dem Kaiser, was des Kaisers ist	23rd Sunday after Trinity	SATB with 2 oboes, 2 violins, viola, cello and continuo	—	Telemann Portal; Catalogue TWV
TVWV 1	TVWV 1:580	Gebet, so wird euch gegeben	4th Sunday after Trinity	SATB with 2 violins, viola, viola da gamba, double bass and continuo	—	Telemann Portal; Catalogue TWV
TVWV 1	TVWV 1:581	Gedenke des Sabbattages	17th Sunday after Trinity	SATB with 2 oboes, 2 violins, viola, cello and continuo	—	Telemann Portal; Catalogue TWV
TVWV 1	TVWV 1:582	Gedenke doch, wie herrlich hoch	Feast of the Assumption of Mary	SATB with flute, horn, 2 violins, viola and continuo	—	Telemann Portal; Catalogue TWV
TVWV 1	TVWV 1:583	Gedenke doch, wie ich so elend	2nd Sunday of Lent	SAB with 2 violins, viola and continuo	= TVWV 10:14	Telemann Portal; Catalogue TWV
TVWV 1	TVWV 1:584	Gedenket an den, der ein solches Widersprechen	Passion Sunday	SATB with 2 oboes, 2 violins, viola, cello and continuo	—	Telemann Portal; Catalogue TWV
TVWV 1	TVWV 1:585	Gedenket! an den, der ein solches Widersprechen	3rd Sunday of Lent	SATB with 2 oboes, 2 violins, viola, cello and continuo	—	Telemann Portal; Catalogue TWV
TVWV 1	TVWV 1:586	Gedenket an Jesum	3rd Sunday of Lent	SATB with 2 oboes, 2 violins, viola, cello and continuo	—	Telemann Portal; Catalogue TWV
TVWV 1	TVWV 1:587	Geduldig sein und hoffen	24th Sunday after Trinity	SATB with 2 oboes, 2 violins, viola, cello and continuo	—	Telemann Portal; Catalogue TWV
TVWV 1	TVWV 1:588	Geduld und Langmut siegen	2nd Sunday after Epiphany	—	Lost	Telemann Portal; Catalogue TWV
TVWV 1	TVWV 1:589	Geduld, wenn Menschen sich zu Teufel machen	3rd Sunday of Lent	SATB with 2 oboes, 2 violins, viola, cello and continuo	—	Telemann Portal; Catalogue TWV
TVWV 1	TVWV 1:590	Gefährten zum Ewgen	New Year	SATB with oboe, 3 trumpets, 2 violins, viola, cello and continuo	—	Telemann Portal; Catalogue TWV
TVWV 1	TVWV 1:591	Gehe hin, mein Volk, in deine Kammer	Feast of the Purification of Mary	SATB with 2 transverse flutes, 2 oboes, 2 violins, viola and continuo	—	Telemann Portal; Catalogue TWV
TVWV 1	TVWV 1:592	Gehet ein durch die enge Pforte	1st Sunday after Trinity	SATB with 2 oboes, 2 violins, viola, cello and continuo	—	Telemann Portal; Catalogue TWV
TVWV 1	TVWV 1:593	Gehet hin, gehet hin durch die Tore	1st Sunday after Advent	SATB with 2 flutes, 2 oboes, 2 violins, viola, cello and continuo	—	Telemann Portal; Catalogue TWV
TVWV 1	TVWV 1:594	Geht heraus, ihr Zions Töchter	Passion Sunday	SATB with 2 violins, viola, cello and continuo	—	Telemann Portal; Catalogue TWV
TVWV 1	TVWV 1:595	Gelobt sei der Gott Israel	Feast of St. John the Baptist	—	Lost	Telemann Portal; Catalogue TWV
TVWV 1	TVWV 1:596	Gelobet sei der Herr, der Gott Israel	Feast of St. John the Baptist	SATB with 2 bugles, timpani, 2 violins, viola, cello and continuo	—	Telemann Portal; Catalogue TWV
TVWV 1	TVWV 1:597	Gelobet sei der Herr, der Gott Israel	Christmas Feast	SATB with 2 oboes, 3 bugles, timpani, 2 violins, viola, double bass and continuo	—	Telemann Portal; Catalogue TWV
TVWV 1	TVWV 1:598	Gelobet sei der Herr, der Gott Israel	Feast of St. John the Baptist	SATB with 2 oboes, (recorder, bassoon, horn), 2 violins, viola and continuo	—	Telemann Portal; Catalogue TWV
TVWV 1	TVWV 1:599	Gelobet sei der Herr, der Gott Israel	Feast of St. John the Baptist	SATB with 2 violins, viola, cello and continuo	—	Telemann Portal; Catalogue TWV
TVWV 1	TVWV 1:600	Gelobet sei der Herr täglich	24th Sunday after Trinity	SATB with 2 oboes, 2 violins, viola, cello and continuo	—	Telemann Portal; Catalogue TWV
TVWV 1	TVWV 1:601	Gelobet sei der Herr	Feast of St. John the Baptist	—	Lost	Telemann Portal; Catalogue TWV
TVWV 1	TVWV 1:602	Gelobet sei der Herr, der Gott Israel	Feast of St. John the Baptist	SATB with 3 flutes, 2 oboes, 4 hunting horns, timpani, 2 violins, viola, cello and continuo	= TVWV 1:1216, HWV Anh. B 205	Telemann Portal; Catalogue TWV
TVWV 1	TVWV 1:603	Gelobet sei des Herrn Nam	16th Sunday after Trinity	SATB with oboe, horn, 2 violins, viola, cello and continuo	—	Telemann Portal; Catalogue TWV
TVWV 1	TVWV 1:604	Gelobet sei Gott, der Herr	Feast of St. John the Baptist	SATB with 2 flutes, 2 oboes, 2 oboes d'amore, 3 trumpets, 2 violins, viola, cello and continuo	—	Telemann Portal; Catalogue TWV
TVWV 1	TVWV 1:605	Gelobet sei Gott, der Herr Israel	New Year	SATB with 2 oboes, 2 violins, viola, cello and continuo	—	Telemann Portal; Catalogue TWV
TVWV 1	TVWV 1:606	Gelobet sei Gott, der mein Gebet	24th Sunday after Trinity	SATB with 2 oboes, 2 violins, viola, cello and continuo	—	Telemann Portal; Catalogue TWV
TVWV 1	TVWV 1:607	Gelobet sei Gott und der Vater	Feast of the Trinity	SATB with 2 oboes, 2 violins, viola, cello and continuo	—	Telemann Portal; Catalogue TWV
TVWV 1	TVWV 1:608	Gelobet sei Gott und der Vater	Easter	SATB with 2 oboes, 2 violins, viola, cello and continuo	—	Telemann Portal; Catalogue TWV
TVWV 1	TVWV 1:609	Gelobet sei Gott und der Vater	Easter	—	Lost	Telemann Portal; Catalogue TWV
TVWV 1	TVWV 1:610	Gelobet sei Gott	Feast of the Trinity	SAB with 2 violins, viola and continuo	—	Telemann Portal; Catalogue TWV
TVWV 1	TVWV 1:611	Gelobet seist du, Jesus Christ	2nd day of the Christmas festival	SATB with 2 oboes, 2 violins, viola, cello and continuo	—	Telemann Portal; Catalogue TWV
TVWV 1	TVWV 1:612	Gelobet seist du, Jesu Christ	Christmas Feast	SATB with 2 violins, viola, cello and continuo	—	Telemann Portal; Catalogue TWV
TVWV 1	TVWV 1:613	Gen Himmel zu dem Vater mein	Sunday after Ascension Day	SATB with 2 oboes, 2 violins, viola, cello and continuo	—	Telemann Portal; Catalogue TWV
TVWV 1	TVWV 1:614	Gerechter Gott, ach strafe nicht	Choral cantata	SATB with 2 violins, viola, cello and continuo	—	Telemann Portal; Catalogue TWV
TVWV 1	TVWV 1:615	Gerechtigkeit und Leben	Feast of the Trinity	—	Lost	Telemann Portal; Catalogue TWV
TVWV 1	TVWV 1:616	Gesegnet ist die Zuversicht	7th Sunday after Trinity	SATB with 2 oboes, 2 violins, viola, cello and continuo	—	Telemann Portal; Catalogue TWV
TVWV 1	TVWV 1:617	Gesegnet sei die Zuversicht	7th Sunday after Trinity	SATB with 2 flutes, 2 violins, viola, cello and continuo	= BWV Anh. I 1	Telemann Portal; Catalogue TWV
TVWV 1	TVWV 1:618	Getrost, getrost, bedrängte Herzen	7th Sunday after Trinity	—	Lost	Telemann Portal; Catalogue TWV
TVWV 1	TVWV 1:619	Getrost, will es gleich oft mit unserer Arbeit	5th Sunday after Trinity	—	Lost	Telemann Portal; Catalogue TWV
TVWV 1	TVWV 1:620	Gib auch den Göttern dieser Erden	23rd Sunday after Trinity	Solo voice with violin, viola and continuo	—	Telemann Portal; Catalogue TWV
TVWV 1	TVWV 1:621	Gib, dass ich mich nicht erhebe	23rd Sunday after Trinity	Solo soprano and SATB with 2 violins, viola, cello and continuo	—	Telemann Portal; Catalogue TWV
TVWV 1	TVWV 1:621a	Gib deiner Gnade Sonnenschein	Septuagesima Sunday	Solo voice with violin, viola and continuo	Version	Catalogue TWV
TVWV 1	TVWV 1:622	Gib mildiglich dein Segen	5th Sunday after Trinity	Solo viola and SATB with 2 violins and continuo	—	Telemann Portal; Catalogue TWV
TVWV 1	TVWV 1:623	Gib mir ein fröhlich Herz	Septuagesima Sunday	SATB with oboe, 2 violins, viola, cello, double bass and continuo	—	Telemann Portal; Catalogue TWV
TVWV 1	TVWV 1:624	Gib uns Segen an die Hand	Septuagesima Sunday	Bass solo and SATB with 2 violins, viola and continuo	—	Telemann Portal; Catalogue TWV
TVWV 1	TVWV 1:625	Gläubst du? Willig. Gläubst du? Nein!	1st Sunday after Easter	SATB,SATB with 2 violins, viola and continuo	—	Telemann Portal; Catalogue TWV
TVWV 1	TVWV 1:626	Glaubet, hoffet, leidet, duldet	26th Sunday after Trinity	Solo voice with violin and continuo	—	Telemann Portal; Catalogue TWV
TVWV 1	TVWV 1:627	Glaubet nicht einem jeglichen Geist	25th Sunday after Trinity	SATB with 2 oboes, 2 violins, viola, cello and continuo	—	Telemann Portal; Catalogue TWV
TVWV 1	TVWV 1:628	Gleichwie der Blitz aufgehet	2nd Sunday of Advent	SATB with 2 oboes, 2 violins and continuo	—	Telemann Portal; Catalogue TWV
TVWV 1	TVWV 1:629	Gleichwie der Hirsch	4th Sunday after Easter	—	Lost	Telemann Portal; Catalogue TWV
TVWV 1	TVWV 1:630	Gleichwie der Regen und Schnee	Sunday of Sexagesima	SATB with 2 oboes, 2 violins, viola, cello and continuo	—	Telemann Portal; Catalogue TWV
TVWV 1	TVWV 1:631	Gleich wie man das Unkraut	5th Sunday after Epiphany	—	Lost	Telemann Portal; Catalogue TWV
TVWV 1	TVWV 1:632	Glückseliges Jerusalem	1st Sunday after Advent	—	Lost	Telemann Portal; Catalogue TWV
TVWV 1	TVWV 1:632a	Gottlichs Kind, lass mit	Christmas Feast	Solo voice with oboe/trombone, violin and continuo	Version	Catalogue TWV
TVWV 1	TVWV 1:633	Gott, bei dir ist die lebendige Quelle	4th Sunday of Advent	SATB with 2 flutes, 2 oboes, 2 violins, viola, cello and continuo	—	Telemann Portal; Catalogue TWV
TVWV 1	TVWV 1:634	Gott der Hoffnung, erfülle euch mit aller Freude	Feast of Pentecost	SATB with 2 oboes, 2 bugles, 2 horns, timpani, 2 violins, viola, cello and continuo	= BWV 218	Telemann Portal; Catalogue TWV
TVWV 1	TVWV 1:635	Gott, der liebt nicht nur die Frommen	10th Sunday after Trinity	Bass solo and SATB with 2 violins, viola and continuo	—	Telemann Portal; Catalogue TWV
TVWV 1	TVWV 1:636	Gott der Vater wohn uns bei	1st Sunday of Lent	SATB with oboe, horn, 2 violins, viola, cello and continuo	—	Telemann Portal; Catalogue TWV
TVWV 1	TVWV 1:637	Gott, du erhörest Gebet	Rogation Festival	SATB with 2 oboes, 2 violins, viola, cello and continuo	—	Telemann Portal; Catalogue TWV
TVWV 1	TVWV 1:638	Gott, du lässest mich erfahren	3rd Sunday after Easter	SATB with 2 oboes, 2 violins, viola, cello and continuo	—	Telemann Portal; Catalogue TWV
TVWV 1	TVWV 1:639	Gottesfurcht, der Weisheit Quelle	1st Sunday after Epiphany	SATB with flute, 2 oboes, 2 violins, viola, cello and continuo	—	Telemann Portal; Catalogue TWV
TVWV 1	TVWV 1:640	Gottes Liebe gehet weit	Feast of the Assumption of Mary	Solo tenor and SATB with 2 violins, viola, cello and continuo	—	Telemann Portal; Catalogue TWV
TVWV 1	TVWV 1:641	Gottes Wort, was ist das vor ein Schatz	Sunday of Sexagesima	SATB with 2 oboes, 2 violins, viola, cello and continuo	—	Telemann Portal; Catalogue TWV
TVWV 1	TVWV 1:642	Gott fähret auf mit Jauchzen	Ascension Day	SATB with 2 oboes, bugle, 2 violins, viola, cello and continuo	= TVWV 1:643	Telemann Portal; Catalogue TWV
TVWV 1	TVWV 1:643	Gott fähret auf mit Jauchzen	Ascension Day	—	= TVWV 1:642	Telemann Portal; Catalogue TWV
TVWV 1	TVWV 1:644	Gott fähret auf mit Jauchzen	Ascension Day	SATB with 2 oboes, 2 violins, viola, cello and continuo	—	Telemann Portal; Catalogue TWV
TVWV 1	TVWV 1:645	Gott fähret auf mit Jauchzen	Ascension Day	SAB with 3 trumpets, timpani, 2 violins, viola and continuo	—	Telemann Portal; Catalogue TWV
TVWV 1	TVWV 1:646	Gott fähret auf mit Jauchzen	Ascension Day	SATB with 2 flutes, 2 oboes, 2 trumpets, timpani, 2 violins, viola, cello and continuo	—	Telemann Portal; Catalogue TWV
TVWV 1	TVWV 1:647	Gott fähret auf mit Jauchzen	Ascension Day	SATB with 3 trumpets, timpani, 2 violins, viola, cello and continuo	—	Telemann Portal; Catalogue TWV
TVWV 1	TVWV 1:648	Gott fähret auf mit Jauchzen	Ascension Day	SATB with 3 trumpets, timpani, 2 violins, viola, cello and continuo	—	Telemann Portal; Catalogue TWV
TVWV 1	TVWV 1:649	Gott gibt sein Wort	Sunday of Sexagesima	—	Lost	Telemann Portal; Catalogue TWV
TVWV 1	TVWV 1:650	Gott hält gewiss, was er versprochen	Feast of St. John the Baptist	SATB with 2 flutes, 2 oboes, 2 violins, viola, cello and continuo	—	Telemann Portal; Catalogue TWV
TVWV 1	TVWV 1:651	Gott hat den Herrn auferwecket	1st Sunday after Easter	—	Lost	Telemann Portal; Catalogue TWV
TVWV 1	TVWV 1:652	Gott hat den Sabbat längst gesetzet	17th Sunday after Trinity	—	Lost	Telemann Portal; Catalogue TWV
TVWV 1	TVWV 1:653	Gott hat Geduld mit uns	22nd Sunday after Trinity	SATB with 2 flutes/oboe, 2 violins, viola, cello and continuo	—	Telemann Portal; Catalogue TWV
TVWV 1	TVWV 1:654	Gott hat Jesum erhöhet	New Year	SATB with 2 oboes, 2 violins, viola, cello and continuo	—	Telemann Portal; Catalogue TWV
TVWV 1	TVWV 1:655	Gott hat sein Kind Jesu verklärt	6th Sunday after Epiphany	—	Lost	Telemann Portal; Catalogue TWV
TVWV 1	TVWV 1:656	Gott hat uns berufen mit einem heiligen Ruf	Septuagesima Sunday	SATB with 2 oboes, 2 violins, viola, cello and continuo	—	Telemann Portal; Catalogue TWV
TVWV 1	TVWV 1:657	Gott hat uns das ewige Leben gegeben	2nd day of the feast of Pentecost	SATB with 2 oboes, 2 violins, viola, cello and continuo	—	Telemann Portal; Catalogue TWV
TVWV 1	TVWV 1:658	Gott hat uns Güter aufgetan	9th Sunday after Trinity	—	—	Telemann Portal; Catalogue TWV
TVWV 1	TVWV 1:659	Gott, ich weihe dir mein Herze	Sunday of Quinquagesima	Soprano/Tenor Solo with Oboe, 2 Violins, Viola and Continuo	—	Telemann Portal; Catalogue TWV
TVWV 1	TVWV 1:660	Gott ist die Liebe, und wer in der Liebe bleibet	18th Sunday after Trinity	SATB with 2 oboes, 2 violins, viola, cello and continuo	—	Telemann Portal; Catalogue TWV
TVWV 1	TVWV 1:661	Gott ist die Liebe, und wer in der Liebe bleibet	17th Sunday after Trinity	SATB with 2 oboes, bassoon, 2 violins, viola, cello and continuo	—	Telemann Portal; Catalogue TWV
TVWV 1	TVWV 1:661a	Gott ist die Liebe	18th Sunday after Trinity	—	Lost	Catalogue TWV
TVWV 1	TVWV 1:662	Gott ist die Liebe, und wer in der Liebe bleibet	18th Sunday after Trinity	—	Lost	Telemann Portal; Catalogue TWV
TVWV 1	TVWV 1:663	Gott ist ein rechter Richter	10th Sunday after Trinity	SATB with 2 oboes, 2 violins, viola, cello and continuo	—	Telemann Portal; Catalogue TWV
TVWV 1	TVWV 1:664	Gott ist für uns! O segensvoller Ruhm	Christmas Feast	—	Lost	Telemann Portal; Catalogue TWV
TVWV 1	TVWV 1:665	Gott ist unsre Zuversicht	4th Sunday after Epiphany	SATB with 2 violins, viola, cello and continuo	—	Telemann Portal; Catalogue TWV
TVWV 1	TVWV 1:666	Gott ist unsre Zuversicht	Sunday After New Year's Eve	—	Lost	Telemann Portal; Catalogue TWV
TVWV 1	TVWV 1:667	Gott ist unsre Zuversicht	4th Sunday after Epiphany	—	Lost	Telemann Portal; Catalogue TWV
TVWV 1	TVWV 1:668	Gott ist unsre Zuversicht	4th Sunday after Epiphany	SATB with 2 flutes, horn, bugle, 2 violins, viola and continuo	—	Telemann Portal; Catalogue TWV
TVWV 1	TVWV 1:669	Gott lässt den Seinen nicht	4th Sunday after Epiphany	—	Lost	Telemann Portal; Catalogue TWV
TVWV 1	TVWV 1:670	Gottlob! Die Frucht hat sich gezeiget	Feast of the Visitation of Mary	Solo voice with violin and continuo	—	Telemann Portal; Catalogue TWV
TVWV 1	TVWV 1:671	Gottlob! Nun geht das Jahr zu Ende	Sunday after Christmas	SATB with flute, 2 oboes, 2 violins, viola, cello and continuo	—	Telemann Portal; Catalogue TWV
TVWV 1	TVWV 1:672	Gott Lob und Dank, heut grüßet uns ein neues Jahr	New Year	SATB with 2 oboes, 2 violins, viola, cello and continuo	—	Telemann Portal; Catalogue TWV
TVWV 1	TVWV 1:673	Gott Lob und Dank, heut grüßet uns ein neues jahr	New Year	Solo tenor with violin, double bass and continuo	—	Telemann Portal; Catalogue TWV
TVWV 1	TVWV 1:674	Gott Lob und Dank	Easter	SATB with 2 bugles, timpani, 2 violins, viola, cello and continuo	—	Telemann Portal; Catalogue TWV
TVWV 1	TVWV 1:675	Gott macht ein Abendmahl von großen Gnaden	2nd Sunday after Trinity	—	Lost	Telemann Portal; Catalogue TWV
TVWV 1	TVWV 1:676	Gott, mein Ruhm schweige nicht	8th Sunday after Trinity	SATB with bassoon, 2 violins and continuo	—	Telemann Portal; Catalogue TWV
TVWV 1	TVWV 1:676a	Gott nimmt die Farren von	14th Sunday after Trinity	Solo voice with violin, viola and continuo	Version	Catalogue TWV
TVWV 1	TVWV 1:677	Gott schützt uns durch der Engel Hut	Feast of St. Michael	SATB with 2 hunting horns, bugle, 2 violins, viola, cello and continuo	—	Telemann Portal; Catalogue TWV
TVWV 1	TVWV 1:678	Gott schweige doch nicht also	Passion Sunday	SATB with 2 oboes, 3 bassoons, 2 violins, viola, cello and continuo	—	Telemann Portal; Catalogue TWV
TVWV 1	TVWV 1:679	Gott segnet den Frommen ihre Güter	5th Sunday after Trinity	SATB with 2 oboes, 2 violins, viola, cello and continuo	—	Telemann Portal; Catalogue TWV
TVWV 1	TVWV 1:680	Gott sei Dank durch alle Welt	1st Sunday after Advent	—	Lost	Telemann Portal; Catalogue TWV
TVWV 1	TVWV 1:681	Gott sei mir gnädig	11th Sunday after Trinity	SATB with 2 oboes, 2 violins, viola, cello and continuo	—	Telemann Portal; Catalogue TWV
TVWV 1	TVWV 1:682	Gott steh mir bei und seine Treu ist täglich neu	5th Sunday after Trinity	SATB with 2 violins, viola, cello and continuo	—	Telemann Portal; Catalogue TWV
TVWV 1	TVWV 1:683	Gott strafe nicht nach meiner Schuld	11th Sunday after Trinity	SATB with 2 violins, viola and continuo	—	Telemann Portal; Catalogue TWV
TVWV 1	TVWV 1:684	Gott straft den Kranken auf seinem Bette	19th Sunday after Trinity	SATB with 2 oboes, 2 violins, viola, cello and continuo	—	Telemann Portal; Catalogue TWV
TVWV 1	TVWV 1:685	Gott über alle Dinge lieben	18th Sunday after Trinity	—	Lost	Telemann Portal; Catalogue TWV
TVWV 1	TVWV 1:686	Gott, unser Heiland, will	20th Sunday after Trinity	SAB with 2 violins, viola and continuo	—	Telemann Portal; Catalogue TWV
TVWV 1	TVWV 1:687	Gott Vater, deine Liebesflammen	Feast of the Trinity	—	Lost	Telemann Portal; Catalogue TWV
TVWV 1	TVWV 1:688	Gott Vater, Sohn und heilger Geist	Feast of the Trinity	SATB with oboe, 2 violins, viola, cello and continuo	—	Telemann Portal; Catalogue TWV
TVWV 1	TVWV 1:689	Gott verlässt die Seinen nicht	Sunday After New Year's Eve	SATB with 2 flutes/oboe, 3 horns, 2 violins, viola and continuo	—	Telemann Portal; Catalogue TWV
TVWV 1	TVWV 1:689a	Gott weiss, ich bin von Seufzen mude	3rd Sunday after Epiphany	Solo voice with 2 recorders/violins and continuo	Version	Catalogue TWV
TVWV 1	TVWV 1:690	Gott widerstehet den Hoffärtigen	17th Sunday after Trinity	—	Lost	Telemann Portal; Catalogue TWV
TVWV 1	TVWV 1:691	Gott widerstehet den Hoffärtigen	17th Sunday after Trinity	SATB with 2 oboes, 2 violins, viola, cello and continuo	—	Telemann Portal; Catalogue TWV
TVWV 1	TVWV 1:692	Gott, wie dein Name, so ist auch dein Ruhm	Feast of the Epiphany	SATB with 2 violins, viola, cello and continuo	—	Telemann Portal; Catalogue TWV
TVWV 1	TVWV 1:693	Gott will, dass allen Menschen geholfen werde	2nd day of the Christmas festival	SATB with 2 oboes, 2 violins, viola, cello and continuo	—	Telemann Portal; Catalogue TWV
TVWV 1	TVWV 1:694	Gott will Mensch und sterblich werden	Feast of the Annunciation of Mary	Solo voice with violin and continuo	—	Telemann Portal; Catalogue TWV
TVWV 1	TVWV 1:695	Gott will uns alle selig haben	2nd Sunday after Trinity	SATB with 2 violins, viola and harpsichord	—	Telemann Portal; Catalogue TWV
TVWV 1	TVWV 1:696	Gott wird geben einem jeglichen	1st Sunday after Trinity	SAB with 2 violins, viola and continuo	—	Telemann Portal; Catalogue TWV
TVWV 1	TVWV 1:697	Gott und in ihm auch Christum lieben	3rd day of Christmas	—	Lost	Telemann Portal; Catalogue TWV
TVWV 1	TVWV 1:698	Gott Zebaoth, in deinem Namen	16th Sunday after Trinity	SATB with 2 oboes, 2 violins, viola, cello and continuo	—	Telemann Portal; Catalogue TWV
TVWV 1	TVWV 1:699	Gott Zebaoth, wende dich	Septuagesima Sunday	SATB with oboe, 2 violins, viola, cello and continuo	—	Telemann Portal; Catalogue TWV
TVWV 1	TVWV 1:700	Greulich sind die letzten Zeiten	25th Sunday after Trinity	SATB with 2 oboes, 2 violins, viola, cello and continuo	—	Telemann Portal; Catalogue TWV
TVWV 1	TVWV 1:701	Große Gottheit, deine Stärke	Miscellaneous cantatas	—	—	Telemann Portal; Catalogue TWV
TVWV 1	TVWV 1:702	Große Städte, große Sünden	10th Sunday after Trinity	SATB with 2 oboes, 2 violins, viola, cello and continuo	—	Telemann Portal; Catalogue TWV
TVWV 1	TVWV 1:703	Groß sind die Werke des Herrn	Feast of the Visitation of Mary	SATB with 2 flutes, oboe, bassoon, 2 violins, viola, cello and continuo	—	Telemann Portal; Catalogue TWV
TVWV 1	TVWV 1:704	Gute Nacht, vergangnes Jahr	New Year	SATB with 2 oboes, 2 trumpets, timpani, 2 violins, viola, cello and continuo	—	Telemann Portal; Catalogue TWV
TVWV 1	TVWV 1:705	Habe deine Lust an dem Herrn	5th Sunday after Trinity	SATB with 2 oboes, 2 violins, viola, cello and continuo	—	Telemann Portal; Catalogue TWV
TVWV 1	TVWV 1:706	Habe deine Lust an dem Herrn	2nd Sunday after Epiphany	—	Lost	Telemann Portal; Catalogue TWV
TVWV 1	TVWV 1:707	Habe deine Lust an dem Herrn	5th Sunday after Trinity	—	Lost	Telemann Portal; Catalogue TWV
TVWV 1	TVWV 1:708	Habt ihr nicht gesehen, den meine Seele liebe	Feast of the Epiphany	SATB with 2 violins, viola, cello and continuo	—	Telemann Portal; Catalogue TWV
TVWV 1	TVWV 1:709	Habt nicht lieb die Welt	1st Sunday after Trinity	SATB with 2 flutes, 2 oboes, 2 violins, viola, cello and continuo	—	Telemann Portal; Catalogue TWV
TVWV 1	TVWV 1:710	Habt nicht lieb die Welt	9th Sunday after Trinity	SATB with 2 oboes, 2 violins, viola, cello and continuo	—	Telemann Portal; Catalogue TWV
TVWV 1	TVWV 1:711	Habt nicht lieb die Welt	20th Sunday after Trinity	SATB with 2 oboes, 2 violins, viola, cello and continuo	—	Telemann Portal; Catalogue TWV
TVWV 1	TVWV 1:712	Halleluja! Er lebt	2nd day of Easter	—	Lost	Telemann Portal; Catalogue TWV
TVWV 1	TVWV 1:713	Halleluja, lobet den Namen des Herrn	New Year	SATB with 3 bugles, timpani, 2 violins, viola and continuo	—	Telemann Portal; Catalogue TWV
TVWV 1	TVWV 1:714	Halleluja! Singet dem Herrn	Feast of the Visitation of Mary	SATB with 2 oboes, 3 bugles, timpani, 2 violins, viola, cello and continuo	—	Telemann Portal; Catalogue TWV
TVWV 1	TVWV 1:715	Halt ein mit deinem Wetterstrahle	New Year	Solo voice with violin and continuo	—	Telemann Portal; Catalogue TWV
TVWV 1	TVWV 1:716	Haltet fest an der Demut	17th Sunday after Trinity	SATB with 2 oboes, 2 violins, viola, cello and continuo	—	Telemann Portal; Catalogue TWV
TVWV 1	TVWV 1:717	Halt im Gedächtnis Jesum Christum	2nd day of Easter	SAB with 2 violins, viola and continuo	—	Telemann Portal; Catalogue TWV
TVWV 1	TVWV 1:718	Hast du denn, Jesu, dein Angesicht gänzlich verborgen	1st Sunday after Advent	SATB with 2 flutes/oboe, 2 violins, viola, cello and continuo	—	Telemann Portal; Catalogue TWV
TVWV 1	TVWV 1:718a	Hast du, Herr der	Feast of Pentecost	Solo voice with violin, viola and continuo	Version	Catalogue TWV
TVWV 1	TVWV 1:718b	Hat Gott nicht zu seiner	25th Sunday after Trinity	Solo voice with violin, viola and continuo	Version	Catalogue TWV
TVWV 1	TVWV 1:718c	Heile mich, du Heil der	3rd Sunday after Epiphany	Solo voice with violin, viola and continuo	Version	Catalogue TWV
TVWV 1	TVWV 1:719	Heilige Flammen der ewigen Liebe	Feast of Pentecost	SATB with 2 flutes/oboe, 2 horns, timpani, 2 violins, viola, cello and continuo	—	Telemann Portal; Catalogue TWV
TVWV 1	TVWV 1:720	Heiliger Same göttlicher Kraft	Sunday of Sexagesima	SATB with 2 oboes, 2 violins, viola, cello and continuo	—	Telemann Portal; Catalogue TWV
TVWV 1	TVWV 1:721	O heiliges Fest, dein liebreicher West	Feast of the Trinity	SATB with 2 trumpets, timpani, 2 violins, viola, cello and continuo	—	Telemann Portal; Catalogue TWV
TVWV 1	TVWV 1:722	Heilige sie, Vater, in deiner	Sunday of Sexagesima	SATB with 2 oboes, 2 violins, viola, cello and continuo	—	Telemann Portal; Catalogue TWV
TVWV 1	TVWV 1:723	Heilig, heilig, heilig ist der Herr	Feast of the Trinity	—	Lost	Telemann Portal; Catalogue TWV
TVWV 1	TVWV 1:724	Heilig, heilig ist der Herr Zebaoth	Feast of the Trinity	SATB with 2 oboes, 3 trumpets, timpani, 2 violins, viola, cello, double bass and continuo	—	Telemann Portal; Catalogue TWV
TVWV 1	TVWV 1:725	Heilig ist der Herr Zebaoth	Feast of the Trinity	—	= TVWV 1:727	Telemann Portal; Catalogue TWV
TVWV 1	TVWV 1:726	Heilig ist der Herr Zebaoth	Feast of the Trinity	SATB with 2 oboes, 2 trumpets, timpani, 2 violins, viola, cello and continuo	—	Telemann Portal; Catalogue TWV
TVWV 1	TVWV 1:727	Heilig ist der Herr Zebaoth	Feast of the Trinity	SATB with 3 bugles, 2 violins, viola, cello and continuo	= TVWV 1:725	Telemann Portal; Catalogue TWV
TVWV 1	TVWV 1:728	Heilig ist Gott, der Herr	Miscellaneous cantatas	SATB ...	—	Telemann Portal; Catalogue TWV
TVWV 1	TVWV 1:729	Helft mir Gottes Güte preisen	New Year	—	Lost	Telemann Portal; Catalogue TWV
TVWV 1	TVWV 1:730	Hemmet den Eifer, verbannet die Rache	4th Sunday after Epiphany	Solo voice with recorder and continuo	—	Telemann Portal; Catalogue TWV
TVWV 1	TVWV 1:731	Herr Christ, den rechten Samen	5th Sunday after Epiphany	Solo soprano and SATB with 2 violins, viola, cello and continuo	—	Telemann Portal; Catalogue TWV
TVWV 1	TVWV 1:732	Herr Christ, der ein'ge Gottessohn	Feast of the Assumption of Mary	SATB with 2 violins, viola, cello and continuo	= BWV Anh. III 156	Telemann Portal; Catalogue TWV
TVWV 1	TVWV 1:733	Herr Christ, der ein'ge Gottessohn	Feast of the Assumption of Mary	SATB with 2 recorders, 2 oboes, 2 violins, viola, cello and continuo	—	Telemann Portal; Catalogue TWV
TVWV 1	TVWV 1:733a	Herr Christ, du hochstes Gut	11th Sunday after Trinity	Solo voice with 2 violins and continuo	Version	Catalogue TWV
TVWV 1	TVWV 1:734	Herr, deine Augen sehen nach dem Glauben	3rd Sunday after Epiphany	SATB with 2 oboes, 2 violins, viola, cello and continuo	—	Telemann Portal; Catalogue TWV
TVWV 1	TVWV 1:735	Herr, dein Wort erhält die, so an dich glauben	1st Sunday of Lent	SATB with 2 oboes, 2 violins, viola, cello and continuo	—	Telemann Portal; Catalogue TWV
TVWV 1	TVWV 1:736	Herr, die Demut fällt zur Erden	3rd Sunday after Epiphany	SATB with 2 oboes, 2 violins, viola, cello and continuo	—	Telemann Portal; Catalogue TWV
TVWV 1	TVWV 1:737	Herr, die Wasserströme erheben sich	4th Sunday after Epiphany	SATB with 2 oboes, 2 violins, viola, cello and continuo	—	Telemann Portal; Catalogue TWV
TVWV 1	TVWV 1:738	Herr, erhöre meine Stimme	Rogation Festival	Solo bass with 2 violins, cello and continuo	—	Telemann Portal; Catalogue TWV
TVWV 1	TVWV 1:739	Herr, es haben die Hoffärtigen	Feast of the Purification of Mary	—	Lost	Telemann Portal; Catalogue TWV
TVWV 1	TVWV 1:740	Herr, gehe nicht ins Gericht	22nd Sunday after Trinity	SATB with 2 violins, viola, cello and continuo	—	Telemann Portal; Catalogue TWV
TVWV 1	TVWV 1:741	Herr, Herr Gott barmherzig und gnädig	19th Sunday after Trinity	SATB with 2 oboes, 2 violins, viola, cello and continuo	—	Telemann Portal; Catalogue TWV
TVWV 1	TVWV 1:742	Herr Gott, der du uns hast von unsrer Jugend an	14th Sunday after Trinity	SATB with 2 violins, viola and continuo	—	Telemann Portal; Catalogue TWV
TVWV 1	TVWV 1:743	Herr Gott, dich loben wir	Feast of St. Michael	—	Lost	Telemann Portal; Catalogue TWV
TVWV 1	TVWV 1:744	Herr Gott, dich loben wir	Feast of St. Michael	—	Lost	Telemann Portal; Catalogue TWV
TVWV 1	TVWV 1:745	Herr Gott, dich loben wir	New Year	SATB with flute, bassoon 2 violins, viola and continuo	—	Telemann Portal; Catalogue TWV
TVWV 1	TVWV 1:746	Herr Gott, du König aller Himmel	Christmas Feast	SATB with 3 bugles, timpani, 2 violins, viola and continuo	—	Telemann Portal; Catalogue TWV
TVWV 1	TVWV 1:747	Herr Gott, ich bin ein Baum	8th Sunday after Trinity	—	Lost	Telemann Portal; Catalogue TWV
TVWV 1	TVWV 1:748	Herr Gott, wenn manches gläubiges Gemüte	5th Sunday after Epiphany	—	Lost	Telemann Portal; Catalogue TWV
TVWV 1	TVWV 1:749	Herr Gott, wer wird es dir genug verdanken	Feast of the Visitation of Mary	SATB with 2 violins, viola, cello and continuo	—	Telemann Portal; Catalogue TWV
TVWV 1	TVWV 1:750	Herr Gott Zebaoth, wer ist wie du	4th Sunday after Epiphany	SATB with 2 oboes, 2 violins, viola, cello and continuo	—	Telemann Portal; Catalogue TWV
TVWV 1	TVWV 1:751	Herr Gott Zebaoth, wie lange willt du zürnen	13th Sunday after Trinity	SATB with 2 oboes, 2 violins, viola, cello and continuo	—	Telemann Portal; Catalogue TWV
TVWV 1	TVWV 1:752	Herr, hilf uns, wir verderben	4th Sunday after Epiphany	SATBBB with 2 oboes, 2 violins, viola and continuo	—	Telemann Portal; Catalogue TWV
TVWV 1	TVWV 1:753	Herr, ich bin beide, dein Pilgrim und dein Bürger	2nd day of Easter	SATB with 2 flutes, 2 oboes, 2 violins, viola, cello and continuo	—	Telemann Portal; Catalogue TWV
TVWV 1	TVWV 1:754	Herr, für dir ist Freude die Fülle	6th Sunday after Epiphany	—	Lost	Telemann Portal; Catalogue TWV
TVWV 1	TVWV 1:755	Herr Jesu Christ, dich zu uns wend	3rd day of the feast of Pentecost	SATB with 2 violins, viola, cello and continuo	—	Telemann Portal; Catalogue TWV
TVWV 1	TVWV 1:756	Herr Jesu Christ, du höchtes Gut	22nd Sunday after Trinity	—	Lost	Telemann Portal; Catalogue TWV
TVWV 1	TVWV 1:757	Herr Jesu Christ, groß ist die Not	4th Sunday after Epiphany	SATB with 2 oboes, 2 violins, viola, cello and continuo	—	Telemann Portal; Catalogue TWV
TVWV 1	TVWV 1:758	Herr Jesu Christ, ich schrei zu dir	2nd Sunday of Lent	SATB with 2 oboes, 2 violins, viola, cello and continuo	—	Telemann Portal; Catalogue TWV
TVWV 1	TVWV 1:759	Herr Jesu Christ, zu dir allein	21st Sunday after Trinity	—	Lost	Telemann Portal; Catalogue TWV
TVWV 1	TVWV 1:760	Herr Jesu, Davids Sohn	Sunday of Quinquagesima	—	Lost	Telemann Portal; Catalogue TWV
TVWV 1	TVWV 1:761	Herr Jesu, der du wunderbar	Sunday after Christmas	SATB with 2 oboes, 2 violins, viola, cello and continuo	—	Telemann Portal; Catalogue TWV
TVWV 1	TVWV 1:762	Herr, lehre mich stets dein End bedenken	2nd day of the Christmas festival	—	Lost	Telemann Portal; Catalogue TWV
TVWV 1	TVWV 1:763	Herr, lehre uns bedenken	16th Sunday after Trinity	SATB with 2 oboes, 2 violins, viola, cello and continuo	—	Telemann Portal; Catalogue TWV
TVWV 1	TVWV 1:764	Herr! meiner Sehnsucht Seltenheit	11th Sunday after Trinity	SATB with 2 oboes, 2 violins, viola, cello and continuo	—	Telemann Portal; Catalogue TWV
TVWV 1	TVWV 1:765	Herr, mein Herz hält dir für dein Wort	22nd Sunday after Trinity	—	Lost	Telemann Portal; Catalogue TWV
TVWV 1	TVWV 1:766	Herr, nun lass in Friede	Feast of the Purification of Mary	Solo tenor and SATB with 2 violins, viola, cello and continuo	—	Telemann Portal; Catalogue TWV
TVWV 1	TVWV 1:766a	Herr, schau, die Seele steht dir offen	4th Sunday of Advent	Solo voice with violin, viola and continuo	Version	Catalogue TWV
TVWV 1	TVWV 1:767	Herr! schau doch meine matte Seele	1st Sunday after Easter	SATB with 2 oboes, 2 violins, viola, cello and continuo	—	Telemann Portal; Catalogue TWV
TVWV 1	TVWV 1:768	Herr, segne meinen Tritt	Sunday After New Year's Eve	Solo viola and SATB with 2 violins, viola, cello and continuo	—	Telemann Portal; Catalogue TWV
TVWV 1	TVWV 1:769	Herr, sei mir gnädig, denn mir ist angst	11th Sunday after Trinity	SATB with flute, 2 oboes, 2 violins, viola, cello, double bass and continuo	—	Telemann Portal; Catalogue TWV
TVWV 1	TVWV 1:770	Herr, sei mir gnädig, heile meine Seele	3rd Sunday after Epiphany	SATB with 2 oboes, 2 violins, viola, cello and continuo	—	Telemann Portal; Catalogue TWV
TVWV 1	TVWV 1:771	Herr, strafe mich nicht in deinem Zorn	19th Sunday after Trinity	SATB with 2 oboes, 3 bugles, timpani, 2 violins, viola, cello and continuo	—	Telemann Portal; Catalogue TWV
TVWV 1	TVWV 1:771a	Herr, streu in mich des Wortes	Sunday of Sexagesima	Solo voice with flute, oboe and continuo	Version	Catalogue TWV
TVWV 1	TVWV 1:772	Herr, tue meine Lippen auf	Feast of St. John the Baptist	—	Lost	Telemann Portal; Catalogue TWV
TVWV 1	TVWV 1:773	Herr, unser Herrscher	Feast of the Epiphany	—	Lost	Telemann Portal; Catalogue TWV
TVWV 1	TVWV 1:774	Herr, warum trittest du so ferne	2nd day of Easter	SATB with 2 flutes, 2 oboes, 2 violins, viola, cello and continuo	—	Telemann Portal; Catalogue TWV
TVWV 1	TVWV 1:775	Herr, was muss ich tun, dass ich das ewige Leben erbe?	Feast of the Trinity	SATB with 2 bugles, timpani, 2 violins, viola, cello and continuo	—	Telemann Portal; Catalogue TWV
TVWV 1	TVWV 1:776	Herr, wenn ich nur dich habe	Feast of the Purification of Mary	—	Lost	Telemann Portal; Catalogue TWV
TVWV 1	TVWV 1:777	Herr, wie lange willt du mein so gar vergessen	2nd Sunday of Lent	SATB with 2 oboes, 2 violins, viola, cello and continuo	—	Telemann Portal; Catalogue TWV
TVWV 1	TVWV 1:778	Herr, wie lange wiltu mein so gar vergessen	2nd Sunday of Lent	SATB with 2 violins, viola, cello and continuo	—	Telemann Portal; Catalogue TWV
TVWV 1	TVWV 1:779	Herr, wie sind deine Werke so groß	15th Sunday after Trinity	SATB with flute, 2 oboes, 2 violins, viola and continuo	—	Telemann Portal; Catalogue TWV
TVWV 1	TVWV 1:780	Herr, wie sind deine Werke so groß	7th Sunday after Trinity	SATB with 2 oboes, 2 violins, viola, cello and continuo	—	Telemann Portal; Catalogue TWV
TVWV 1	TVWV 1:781	Herr, wir liegen vor dir mit unserm Gebet	6th Sunday after Trinity	SATB with flute, 2 violins, viola, cello and continuo	—	Telemann Portal; Catalogue TWV
TVWV 1	TVWV 1:782	Herr, wir liegen vor dir mit unserm Gebet	Rogation Festival	SATB with 2 oboes, 2 violins, viola, cello and continuo	—	Telemann Portal; Catalogue TWV
TVWV 1	TVWV 1:782a	Herzbrechend ist das Augenbrechen	16th Sunday after Trinity	Solo voice with 2 flutes and continuo	Version	Catalogue TWV
TVWV 1	TVWV 1:783	Herzlich lieb hab ich dich, o Herr	18th Sunday after Trinity	SATB with 2 flutes/oboe, 2 violins, viola, cello and continuo	—	Telemann Portal; Catalogue TWV
TVWV 1	TVWV 1:784	Herzlich tut mich verlangen	Feast of the Purification of Mary	SATB with 2 violins, viola and continuo	—	Telemann Portal; Catalogue TWV
TVWV 1	TVWV 1:785	Herzliebster Jesu, was hast du verbrochen	2nd Sunday after Easter	SATB with 2 oboes, 2 violins, viola, cello and continuo	—	Telemann Portal; Catalogue TWV
TVWV 1	TVWV 1:786	Herzog meiner Seligkeit	16th Sunday after Trinity	SATB with 2 flutes, 2 violins, viola, cello and continuo	—	Telemann Portal; Catalogue TWV
TVWV 1	TVWV 1:786a	Heult, verruchte	2nd Sunday of Advent	Solo voice with violin, viola and continuo	Version	Catalogue TWV
TVWV 1	TVWV 1:787	Heute geht aus seiner Kammer Gottes Held	2nd day of the Christmas festival	SATB with 2 oboes, 2 violins, viola, cello and continuo	—	Telemann Portal; Catalogue TWV
TVWV 1	TVWV 1:788	Heute, wo ihr seine Stimme hören werdet	20th Sunday after Trinity	—	Lost	Telemann Portal; Catalogue TWV
TVWV 1	TVWV 1:789	Heut ist die werte Christenheit	1st Sunday after Advent	SATB with 2 bugles, 2 violins, viola, cello and continuo	—	Telemann Portal; Catalogue TWV
TVWV 1	TVWV 1:790	Heut lebst du, heut bekehre dich	Feast of St. John the Baptist	SATB with oboe, 2 violins, viola, cello and continuo	—	Telemann Portal; Catalogue TWV
TVWV 1	TVWV 1:791	Heut schleußt er wieder auf die Tür	Ascension Day	SATB with oboe, 2 trumpets, timpani, 2 violins, viola, cello and continuo	—	Telemann Portal; Catalogue TWV
TVWV 1	TVWV 1:792	Heut triumphieret Gottes Sohn	2nd Sunday after Easter	—	Lost	Telemann Portal; Catalogue TWV
TVWV 1	TVWV 1:793	Heut triumphieret Gottes Sohn	2nd day of Easter	SATB with 2 flutes, 3 piccolo bugles, timpani, 2 violins, viola, cello and continuo	—	Telemann Portal; Catalogue TWV
TVWV 1	TVWV 1:794	Hier hab ich meine Plage	13th Sunday after Trinity	Solo tenor and SATB with 2 violins, viola, cello and continuo	—	Telemann Portal; Catalogue TWV
TVWV 1	TVWV 1:795	Hier ist mein Herz, geliebter Jesu	Feast of the Epiphany	ST with 2 violins, viola, cello and continuo	—	Telemann Portal; Catalogue TWV
TVWV 1	TVWV 1:796	Hier kann das Los uns nicht nach Willen fallen	21st Sunday after Trinity	—	Lost	Telemann Portal; Catalogue TWV
TVWV 1	TVWV 1:797	Hier schläft es, o wie süße	Christmas Feast	SATB with 2 recorders, 2 oboes, 2 horns, 3 trumpets, timpani, 2 violins, viola, cello and continuo	—	Telemann Portal; Catalogue TWV
TVWV 1	TVWV 1:797a	Hilf, dass durch dieser Mahlzeit Kraft	18th Sunday after Trinity	Solo soprano and SATB with oboe and continuo	Cantata Part	Catalogue TWV
TVWV 1	TVWV 1:798	Hilf, dass ich sei von Herzen froh	11th Sunday after Trinity	Solo bass and SATB with oboe, 2 violins, viola and continuo	—	Telemann Portal; Catalogue TWV
TVWV 1	TVWV 1:799	Hilf, Herr, die Heiligen haben abgenommen	25th Sunday after Trinity	SATB with 2 oboes, 2 violins, viola, cello, double bass and continuo	—	Telemann Portal; Catalogue TWV
TVWV 1	TVWV 1:800	Hilf, Herr, die Heiligen haben abgenommen	8th Sunday after Trinity	SATB with 2 oboes, 2 violins, viola, cello and continuo	—	Telemann Portal; Catalogue TWV
TVWV 1	TVWV 1:801	Hilf, Herr, die Heiligen haben abgenommen	13th Sunday after Trinity	—	Lost	Telemann Portal; Catalogue TWV
TVWV 1	TVWV 1:802	Hilf, Jesu, hilf, ich bin in Sünden krank	Choral cantata for communion	Solo soprano with 2 violins, viola and continuo	—	Telemann Portal; Catalogue TWV
TVWV 1	TVWV 1:803	Hilf, Herr! o hilf, du großer König	Palm Sunday	SATB with 2 oboes, 2 violins, viola, cello and continuo	—	Telemann Portal; Catalogue TWV
TVWV 1	TVWV 1:804	Hinweg mit allen Schätzen	Feast of Pentecost	—	Lost	Telemann Portal; Catalogue TWV
TVWV 1	TVWV 1:805	Hirt' und Bischof unsrer Seelen	2nd Sunday after Easter	Solo voice with violin and continuo	—	Telemann Portal; Catalogue TWV
TVWV 1	TVWV 1:805a	Hochselige Blicks voll heiliger Wonne	13th Sunday after Trinity	Solo voice and unison voice with continuo	Version	Catalogue TWV
TVWV 1	TVWV 1:805b	Horst du garnicht unser Flehen	4th Sunday after Epiphany	—	Version	Catalogue TWV
TVWV 1	TVWV 1:806	Horche nur, dort regt sich was	3rd day of Easter	SATB,SATB with 2 transverse flutes, 2 oboes, 2 violins, viola and continuo	—	Telemann Portal; Catalogue TWV
TVWV 1	TVWV 1:807	Diesen Tag hat Gott gemacht	1st Sunday after Advent	—	= TVWV 1:354	Telemann Portal; Catalogue TWV
TVWV 1	TVWV 1:808	Hosianna dem Sohne David	1st Sunday after Advent	SATB with 2 flutes/oboe, 2 violins, viola, cello and continuo	—	Telemann Portal; Catalogue TWV
TVWV 1	TVWV 1:809	Hosianna dem Sohne David	1st Sunday after Advent	SAB with 2 violins, viola and continuo	—	Telemann Portal; Catalogue TWV
TVWV 1	TVWV 1:810	Hosianna, dieses soll die Losung sein	Christmas Feast	SATB with 2 flutes/oboes, 3 trumpets, [2 horns], timpani, 2 violins, viola, cello and continuo	—	Telemann Portal; Catalogue TWV
TVWV 1	TVWV 1:811	Hütet euch, dass eure Herzen	2nd Sunday of Advent	SATB with 2 oboes, 2 violins, viola, cello and continuo	—	Telemann Portal; Catalogue TWV
TVWV 1	TVWV 1:812	Ich armer Mensch, ich armer Sünder	Miscellaneous cantatas	—	—	Telemann Portal; Catalogue TWV
TVWV 1	TVWV 1:813	Ich armer Mensch, ich bin ja Staub und Erde	20th Sunday after Trinity	Solo soprano with oboe, bassoon, violin, double bass and continuo	—	Telemann Portal; Catalogue TWV
TVWV 1	TVWV 1:814	Ich bin arm und elend	Sunday After New Year's Eve	SAB with 2 violins, viola and continuo	—	Telemann Portal; Catalogue TWV
TVWV 1	TVWV 1:815	Ich bin das A und das O	Easter	SATB with 2 flutes, 2 oboes, 2 trumpets, timpani, 2 violins, viola, cello and continuo	—	Telemann Portal; Catalogue TWV
TVWV 1	TVWV 1:816	Ich bin der erste und der letzte	Easter	SATB with 2 oboes, 2 clarions, timpani, 2 violins, viola, cello and continuo	—	Telemann Portal; Catalogue TWV
TVWV 1	TVWV 1:817	Ich bin der Herr, dein Arzt	12th Sunday after Trinity	SATB with 2 oboes, 2 violins, viola, cello and continuo	—	Telemann Portal; Catalogue TWV
TVWV 1	TVWV 1:818	Ich bin der Weg, die Wahrheit und das Leben	3rd day of Christmas	SATB with 2 violins, viola and continuo	—	Telemann Portal; Catalogue TWV
TVWV 1	TVWV 1:819	Ich bin dir, Herr, mehr als zehntausend schuldig	22nd Sunday after Trinity	SATB with 2 violins, viola, cello and continuo	—	Telemann Portal; Catalogue TWV
TVWV 1	TVWV 1:820	Ich bin getauft in Christi Tode	6th Sunday after Trinity	Solo voice with flute and continuo	—	Telemann Portal; Catalogue TWV
TVWV 1	TVWV 1:821	Ich bin getrost in meinem Leben	Feast of St. Michael	SATB with 2 oboes, 2 bugles, 2 violins, viola, cello and continuo	—	Telemann Portal; Catalogue TWV
TVWV 1	TVWV 1:822	Ich bin ja Herr in deiner Macht	Choral cantata	SATB with 2 oboes, oboe d'amore, bassoon, bugle, 2 violins, viola, cello and continuo	—	Telemann Portal; Catalogue TWV
TVWV 1	TVWV 1:823	Ich bin vergnügt an diesen Gütern	9th Sunday after Trinity	SATB with 2 oboes, 2 violins, viola, cello and continuo	—	Telemann Portal; Catalogue TWV
TVWV 1	TVWV 1:824	Ich danke dir und preise	12th Sunday after Trinity	Solo viola and SATB with 2 violins, viola, cello and continuo	—	Telemann Portal; Catalogue TWV
TVWV 1	TVWV 1:825	Ich fahre auf zu meinem Vater	Ascension Day	SATB with 2 flutes/oboe, 2 horns, 2 violins, viola, cello and continuo	—	Telemann Portal; Catalogue TWV
TVWV 1	TVWV 1:826	Ich freue mich im Herren	20th Sunday after Trinity	TB with oboe d'amore, 2 violins, viola, cello and continuo	—	Telemann Portal; Catalogue TWV
TVWV 1	TVWV 1:827	Ich fürchte keinen Tod auf Erden	24th Sunday after Trinity	SATB with 2 flutes, 2 oboes, 2 violins, viola, cello and continuo	—	Telemann Portal; Catalogue TWV
TVWV 1	TVWV 1:828	Ich fürchte mich nicht	Sunday After New Year's Eve	—	Lost	Telemann Portal; Catalogue TWV
TVWV 1	TVWV 1:829	Ich gehe voll Freuden zum Hause des Herrn	Miscellaneous cantatas	SATB with 2 oboes, 2 bugles, 2 violins, viola, cello and continuo	—	Telemann Portal; Catalogue TWV
TVWV 1	TVWV 1:830	Ich irre, seufze, klage	3rd Sunday after Trinity	SATB with 2 oboes, 2 violins, viola, cello and continuo	—	Telemann Portal; Catalogue TWV
TVWV 1	TVWV 1:831	Ich glaube aber, dass ich sehen werde	Miscellaneous cantatas	SATB with 2 oboes, hunting horn, 2 violins, viola and continuo	—	Telemann Portal; Catalogue TWV
TVWV 1	TVWV 1:832	Ich hab in meiner Jahre Morgen	Septuagesima Sunday	—	Lost	Telemann Portal; Catalogue TWV
TVWV 1	TVWV 1:833	Ich habe Lust abzuscheiden	16th Sunday after Trinity	SATB with 2 oboes, 2 violins, viola, cello and continuo	—	Telemann Portal; Catalogue TWV
TVWV 1	TVWV 1:834	Ich habe Lust abzuscheiden	16th Sunday after Trinity	SATB with 2 flutes/oboe, 2 violins, viola, cello and continuo	—	Telemann Portal; Catalogue TWV
TVWV 1	TVWV 1:835	Ich habe Lust abzuscheiden	16th Sunday after Trinity	—	Lost	Telemann Portal; Catalogue TWV
TVWV 1	TVWV 1:836	Ich habe Lust, abzuscheiden	Feast of the Purification of Mary	SAB with 2 violins, cello and continuo	—	Telemann Portal; Catalogue TWV
TVWV 1	TVWV 1:837	Ich habe meine Lust	1st Sunday after Advent	—	Lost	Telemann Portal; Catalogue TWV
TVWV 1	TVWV 1:838	Ich habe oft des Himmels Mann verachtet	Feast of the Trinity	—	Lost	Telemann Portal; Catalogue TWV
TVWV 1	TVWV 1:839	Ich habe Wächter über euch gesetzt	2nd day of the Christmas festival	SATB with 2 oboes, bassoon, 2 violins, viola, cello and continuo	—	Telemann Portal; Catalogue TWV
TVWV 1	TVWV 1:840	Ich halte aber dafür	Sunday after Ascension Day	SATB with flute, 2 oboes, 2 violins, viola, cello and continuo	—	Telemann Portal; Catalogue TWV
TVWV 1	TVWV 1:841	Ich halte es dafür, dass dieser Zeit Leiden	Sunday after Ascension Day	SAB with 2 violins, viola and continuo	—	Telemann Portal; Catalogue TWV
TVWV 1	TVWV 1:842	Ich hatte mich verirret	3rd Sunday after Trinity	Solo tenor and SATB with 2 violins, viola, cello and continuo	—	Telemann Portal; Catalogue TWV
TVWV 1	TVWV 1:843	Ich hatte viel Bekümmernisse	2nd Sunday of Lent	SATB with 2 oboes, 2 violins, viola, cello and continuo	—	Telemann Portal; Catalogue TWV
TVWV 1	TVWV 1:844	Ich hebe meine Augen auf zu den Bergen	Sunday of Sexagesima	—	Lost	Telemann Portal; Catalogue TWV
TVWV 1	TVWV 1:845	Ich hebe meine Augen auf zu den Bergen	3rd Sunday after Epiphany	SATB with 2 oboes, 2 violins, viola, cello and continuo	—	Telemann Portal; Catalogue TWV
TVWV 1	TVWV 1:846	Ich hebe mich ein wenig kaum empor	Passion Sunday	SATB with 2 violins, viola and continuo	—	Telemann Portal; Catalogue TWV
TVWV 1	TVWV 1:847	Ich hoffe darauf, dass du so gnädig bist	3rd Sunday after Easter	SATB with 2 flutes/oboes, timpani, 2 violins, viola, cello and continuo	—	Telemann Portal; Catalogue TWV
TVWV 1	TVWV 1:848	Ich hoffe darauf, dass du so gnädig bist	21st Sunday after Trinity	SAB with 2 violins, viola and continuo	—	Telemann Portal; Catalogue TWV
TVWV 1	TVWV 1:849	Ich komm, o höchster Gott, zu dir	2nd Sunday after Trinity	SATB with 2 violins, viola, cello and continuo	—	Telemann Portal; Catalogue TWV
TVWV 1	TVWV 1:850	Ich lebe und ihr sollt auch leben	Easter	SATB with 2 transverse flutes, oboe, 2 trumpets, timpani, 2 violins, viola, cello and continuo	—	Telemann Portal; Catalogue TWV
TVWV 1	TVWV 1:851	Ich muss auf den Bergen weinen	10th Sunday after Trinity	SATB with flute, oboe, 2 violins, viola, cello and continuo	—	Telemann Portal; Catalogue TWV
TVWV 1	TVWV 1:852	Ich muss im Leben immer wandeln	3rd Sunday after Easter	SATB with 2 violins, viola, cello and continuo	—	Telemann Portal; Catalogue TWV
TVWV 1	TVWV 1:853	Ich muss seufzen	3rd Sunday of Lent	SATB with 2 oboes, 2 violins, viola, cello and continuo	—	Telemann Portal; Catalogue TWV
TVWV 1	TVWV 1:854	Ich recke meine Hand aus	2nd Sunday after Trinity	SATB with 2 oboes, 2 violins, 2 violas, cello and continuo	—	Telemann Portal; Catalogue TWV
TVWV 1	TVWV 1:855	Ich rufe dich demütig flehend an	Feast of Pentecost	SATB with 2 violins, viola and continuo	—	Telemann Portal; Catalogue TWV
TVWV 1	TVWV 1:856	Ich rufe zu dir, Herr Jesu Christ	22nd Sunday after Trinity	—	Lost	Telemann Portal; Catalogue TWV
TVWV 1	TVWV 1:857	Ich ruf zu dir, Herr Jesu Christ	6th Sunday after Trinity	Bass solo and SATB with 2 violins, viola and continuo	—	Telemann Portal; Catalogue TWV
TVWV 1	TVWV 1:858	Ich sage euch, dieser ging hinab	11th Sunday after Trinity	SATB with 2 oboes, 2 violins, viola, cello and continuo	—	Telemann Portal; Catalogue TWV
TVWV 1	TVWV 1:859	Ich schaue bloß auf Gottes Güte	18th Sunday after Trinity	Solo voice with flute and continuo	—	Telemann Portal; Catalogue TWV
TVWV 1	TVWV 1:860	Ich schicke mich zu meinem Ende	16th Sunday after Trinity	Soprano solo with 2 violins and continuo	—	Telemann Portal; Catalogue TWV
TVWV 1	TVWV 1:861	Ich schlafe, aber mein Herz wachet	Miscellaneous cantatas	SB with 2 violins and continuo	—	Telemann Portal; Catalogue TWV
TVWV 1	TVWV 1:862	Ich schreie, Gott, zu dir	2nd Sunday of Lent	—	Lost	Telemann Portal; Catalogue TWV
TVWV 1	TVWV 1:862a	Ich seh auch fast mit bittern	Sunday of Quinquagesima	Solo voice with 2 violins and continuo	Version	Catalogue TWV
TVWV 1	TVWV 1:863	Ich sehe mich mit Finsternissen	Feast of St. John the Baptist	SATB with 2 violins, viola, cello and continuo	—	Telemann Portal; Catalogue TWV
TVWV 1	TVWV 1:863a	Ich seufze, winsle, klage	2nd Sunday of Lent	Solo voice with violin, viola and continuo	Version	Catalogue TWV
TVWV 1	TVWV 1:864	Ich sprach in meinem Zagen	16th Sunday after Trinity	—	Lost	Telemann Portal; Catalogue TWV
TVWV 1	TVWV 1:865	Ich suchte, den meine Seele liebet	Easter	—	Lost	Telemann Portal; Catalogue TWV
TVWV 1	TVWV 1:866	Ich suchte des Nachts in meinem Bette	1st Sunday after Epiphany	SATB with 2 oboes, 3 bugles, timpani, 2 violins, viola, cello and continuo	—	Telemann Portal; Catalogue TWV
TVWV 1	TVWV 1:867	Ich taumle vor Freuden	27th Sunday after Trinity	Solo voice with violin, viola and continuo	—	Catalogue TWV
TVWV 1	TVWV 1:868	Ich trau auf Gott	Palm Sunday	Solo soprano and SATB with 2 violins, viola, cello and continuo	—	Telemann Portal; Catalogue TWV
TVWV 1	TVWV 1:869	Ich traue Gott und seinem Segen	4th Sunday of Lent	SATB with 2 oboes, 2 violins, viola, cello and continuo	—	Telemann Portal; Catalogue TWV
TVWV 1	TVWV 1:870	Ich wandere in einer Irre, wohin?	2nd day of Easter	—	Lost	Telemann Portal; Catalogue TWV
TVWV 1	TVWV 1:871	Ich wandle mit furchtsamen Schritten	5th Sunday after Epiphany	SATB with 2 violins, viola and continuo	—	Telemann Portal; Catalogue TWV
TVWV 1	TVWV 1:872	Ich war tot und siehe, ich bin lebendig	Easter	SATB with 2 oboes, 2 violins, viola and continuo	—	Telemann Portal; Catalogue TWV
TVWV 1	TVWV 1:872a	Ich weine, durch der Armut	4th Sunday of Lent	Solo voice with viola and continuo	Version	Catalogue TWV
TVWV 1	TVWV 1:873	Ich weiß, dass mein Erlöser lebt	2nd day of Easter	SATB with 2 oboes, 2 violins, viola, cello and continuo	—	Telemann Portal; Catalogue TWV
TVWV 1	TVWV 1:874	Ich weiß, dass mein Erlöser lebt	24th Sunday after Trinity	SATB with 2 violins, 2 violas and continuo	—	Telemann Portal; Catalogue TWV
TVWV 1	TVWV 1:875	Ich weiß, dass mein Erlöser lebt	Easter	SATB with 2 violins, viola, cello and continuo	—	Telemann Portal; Catalogue TWV
TVWV 1	TVWV 1:876	Ich weiß, dass mein Erlöser lebt	24th Sunday after Trinity	SATB with 2 violins, viola, cello and continuo	—	Telemann Portal; Catalogue TWV
TVWV 1	TVWV 1:877	Ich weiß, dass mein Erlöser lebt	Easter	Soprano or Tenor solo with violin and continuo	= BWV 160, BWV Anh. III 157	Telemann Portal; Catalogue TWV
TVWV 1	TVWV 1:878	Ich weiß, dass mein Erlöser lebt	Easter	SATB with 3 bugles, timpani, 2 violins, viola and continuo	—	Telemann Portal; Catalogue TWV
TVWV 1	TVWV 1:879	Ich weiß, dass mein Erlöser lebt	2nd day of Easter	SATB with 2 flutes, 2 oboes, 2 violins, viola, cello and continuo	—	Telemann Portal; Catalogue TWV
TVWV 1	TVWV 1:880	Ich weiß wohl, was ich für Gedanken über euch habe	3rd day of Easter	SATB with 2 violins, viola, cello and continuo	—	Telemann Portal; Catalogue TWV
TVWV 1	TVWV 1:881	Ich werde fast entzückt	Feast of the Assumption of Mary	Solo voice with 2 oboes and continuo	—	Telemann Portal; Catalogue TWV
TVWV 1	TVWV 1:882	Ich werfe mich zu deinen Füßen	19th Sunday after Trinity	SATB with 2 oboes, theorbo, 2 violins, 2 violas, cello and continuo	—	Telemann Portal; Catalogue TWV
TVWV 1	TVWV 1:883	Ich will auf den Herrn schauen	Feast of the Purification of Mary	—	Lost	Telemann Portal; Catalogue TWV
TVWV 1	TVWV 1:884	Ich will den Kreuzweg gerne gehen	21st Sunday after Trinity	Bass solo with violin and continuo	—	Telemann Portal; Catalogue TWV
TVWV 1	TVWV 1:885	Ich will dich erhöhen	14th Sunday after Trinity	SATB with 2 oboes, 2 bugles, 2 violins, viola, cello and continuo	—	Telemann Portal; Catalogue TWV
TVWV 1	TVWV 1:886	Ich will dich erhöhen, mein Gott	7th Sunday after Trinity	SATB with oboe, 2 violins, viola, cello and continuo	—	Telemann Portal; Catalogue TWV
TVWV 1	TVWV 1:887	Ich will die müden Seelen erquicken	10th Sunday after Trinity	—	—	Telemann Portal; Catalogue TWV
TVWV 1	TVWV 1:888	Ich will mich mit dir verloben	20th Sunday after Trinity	SATB with 2 flutes/oboe, 2 violins, viola, cello and continuo	—	Telemann Portal; Catalogue TWV
TVWV 1	TVWV 1:889	Ich will mich mit dir verloben	2nd Sunday after Epiphany	SATB with 2 oboes, 2 violins, viola, cello and continuo	—	Telemann Portal; Catalogue TWV
TVWV 1	TVWV 1:890	Ich will mit Danken kommen	10th Sunday after Trinity	SAT with 2 flutes, oboe, 2 violins, viola, cello and continuo	Same As TVWV 1:1220, Different Text	Telemann Portal; Catalogue TWV
TVWV 1	TVWV 1:891	Ich will rein Wasser über euch sprengen	14th Sunday after Trinity	SATB with oboe, 2 violins, viola, cello and continuo	—	Telemann Portal; Catalogue TWV
TVWV 1	TVWV 1:892	Ich will rühmen Gottes Wort	Sunday After New Year's Eve	—	Lost	Telemann Portal; Catalogue TWV
TVWV 1	TVWV 1:893	Ich will singen von der Gnade des Herrn	3rd Sunday of Lent	SATB with oboe, bassoon, 2 violins, viola, 2 cellos and continuo	= TVWV 1:1655	Telemann Portal; Catalogue TWV
TVWV 1	TVWV 1:894	Ich winselte wie ein Kranich	3rd Sunday after Epiphany	SATB with 2 flutes/oboe, 2 violins, viola, cello and continuo	—	Telemann Portal; Catalogue TWV
TVWV 1	TVWV 1:895	Ihr Christen, findet euch zu Gott mit Beten	14th Sunday after Trinity	—	Lost	Telemann Portal; Catalogue TWV
TVWV 1	TVWV 1:896	Das Blut Christi wird unser Gewissen reinigen	14th Sunday after Trinity	SATB with 2 oboes, 2 violins, viola, cello and continuo	= TVWV 1:171	Telemann Portal; Catalogue TWV
TVWV 1	TVWV 1:897	Ihr, deren Leben mit banger Finsternis umgeben	12th Sunday after Trinity	Solo voice with violin and continuo	—	Telemann Portal; Catalogue TWV
TVWV 1	TVWV 1:898	Ihr, die ihr Christi Namen nennt	Passion Sunday	Solo bass and SATB with 2 violins, viola, cello and continuo	—	Telemann Portal; Catalogue TWV
TVWV 1	TVWV 1:899	Ihr, die ihr euren Nächsten sucht	4th Sunday after Trinity	SATB with 2 violins, viola, cello and continuo	—	Telemann Portal; Catalogue TWV
TVWV 1	TVWV 1:900	Ihr frommen Christen, auf	Sunday of Quinquagesima	SATB with 2 oboes, 2 violins, viola, cello and continuo	= TVWV 1:1416	Telemann Portal; Catalogue TWV
TVWV 1	TVWV 1:901	Ihr Gerechten, freuet euch des Herrn	Palm Sunday	SAB with 2 violins, viola and continuo	—	Telemann Portal; Catalogue TWV
TVWV 1	TVWV 1:902	Ihr gesandten Jesuherzen	10th Sunday after Trinity	—	Lost	Telemann Portal; Catalogue TWV
TVWV 1	TVWV 1:903	Ihr habt nicht einen knechtischen Geist empfangen	Feast of Pentecost	—	Lost	Telemann Portal; Catalogue TWV
TVWV 1	TVWV 1:904	Ihr habt nicht einen knechtischen Geist empfangen	Feast of Pentecost	SATB with 2 oboes, 3 trumpets, timpani, 2 violins, viola, cello and continuo	—	Telemann Portal; Catalogue TWV
TVWV 1	TVWV 1:905	Ihr habt nicht einen knechtischen Geist	Feast of Pentecost	SATB with recorder, 2 flutes, 2 oboes, 2 trumpets, timpani, 2 violins, viola, cello and continuo	—	Telemann Portal; Catalogue TWV
TVWV 1	TVWV 1:906	Ihr Heuchler, die ihr euch	11th Sunday after Trinity	SATB with 2 horns, 2 violins, viola, cello and continuo	—	Telemann Portal; Catalogue TWV
TVWV 1	TVWV 1:906a	Ihr im Sunden tote Glieder	3rd day of Easter	Solo voice with violin, viola and continuo	Version	Catalogue TWV
TVWV 1	TVWV 1:907	Ihr irrenden Lichter verschwindender Lüste	2nd Sunday after Easter	—	Lost	Telemann Portal; Catalogue TWV
TVWV 1	TVWV 1:908	Ihr Lieben, gläubet nicht einem jeglichen Geist	8th Sunday after Trinity	SAB with 2 violins, viola and continuo	—	Telemann Portal; Catalogue TWV
TVWV 1	TVWV 1:909	Ihr Lieben, lasset uns untereinander liebhaben	13th Sunday after Trinity	SATB with 2 oboes, 2 violins, viola, cello and continuo	—	Telemann Portal; Catalogue TWV
TVWV 1	TVWV 1:910	Ihr Mauren des irdischen Jericho	2nd Sunday of Advent	—	= TVWV 1:1548	Telemann Portal; Catalogue TWV
TVWV 1	TVWV 1:911	Ihr schnöden Sünden, packt euch	1st Sunday after Epiphany	—	Lost	Telemann Portal; Catalogue TWV
TVWV 1	TVWV 1:912	Ihr schlüchternen Blicke	26th Sunday after Trinity	Solo voice with violin, viola and continuo	—	Telemann Portal; Catalogue TWV
TVWV 1	TVWV 1:913	Ihr Seelen, die ihr denkt an jenen	6th Sunday after Trinity	—	Lost	Telemann Portal; Catalogue TWV
TVWV 1	TVWV 1:914	Ihr seid alle Gottes Kinder	4th Sunday of Advent	SATB with 2 oboes, 2 violins, viola, cello and continuo	—	Telemann Portal; Catalogue TWV
TVWV 1	TVWV 1:915	Ihr seid alle Gottes Kinder	4th Sunday of Advent	SATB with 2 oboes, bassoon, 2 violins, viola, cello and continuo	—	Telemann Portal; Catalogue TWV
TVWV 1	TVWV 1:916	Ihr seid alle Gottes Kinder	4th Sunday of Advent	SATB with 2 violins, viola, double bass and continuo	—	Telemann Portal; Catalogue TWV
TVWV 1	TVWV 1:917	Ihr seligen Stunden erquickender Freuden	4th Sunday after Trinity	Solo voice with violin and continuo	—	Telemann Portal; Catalogue TWV
TVWV 1	TVWV 1:918	Ihr sollet geschickt sein	26th Sunday after Trinity	SATB with 2 oboes, 2 violins, viola, cello and continuo	—	Telemann Portal; Catalogue TWV
TVWV 1	TVWV 1:919	Ihr Völker, bringet her	Feast of the Epiphany	SATB with 2 violins, viola, cello and continuo	—	Telemann Portal; Catalogue TWV
TVWV 1	TVWV 1:920	Ihr Völker, bringet her	Feast of the Epiphany	SATB with 2 oboes, 2 violins, viola, cello and continuo	—	Telemann Portal; Catalogue TWV
TVWV 1	TVWV 1:921	Ihr Völker, hört, wie Gott aufs neue spricht	Feast of the Epiphany	—	—	Telemann Portal; Catalogue TWV
TVWV 1	TVWV 1:922	Ihr werdet aus Gottes Macht	21st Sunday after Trinity	SATB with 2 oboes, 2 violins, viola, double bass and continuo	—	Telemann Portal; Catalogue TWV
TVWV 1	TVWV 1:923	Ihr werdet weinen und heulen	3rd Sunday after Easter	SATB with 2 oboes, 2 violins, viola, cello and continuo	—	Telemann Portal; Catalogue TWV
TVWV 1	TVWV 1:924	Ihr Wölfe, droht mit euren Klauen	3rd day of the feast of Pentecost	Solo voice with violin, viola and continuo	—	Telemann Portal; Catalogue TWV
TVWV 1	TVWV 1:925	Im Glück sich brüsten zu schwärmen	1st Sunday after Epiphany	—	Lost	Telemann Portal; Catalogue TWV
TVWV 1	TVWV 1:926	Im hellen Glanz der Glaubenssohne	3rd day of Christmas	SATTB with 2 violins, viola and continuo	—	Telemann Portal; Catalogue TWV
TVWV 1	TVWV 1:927	Im sechsten Monat war der Engel Gabriel	Feast of the Assumption of Mary	SATB with 2 oboes, bugle, 2 violins, 2 violas, cello and continuo	—	Telemann Portal; Catalogue TWV
TVWV 1	TVWV 1:928	In allen meinen Taten	5th Sunday after Trinity	Bass solo and SATB with 2 oboes, 2 violins, viola and continuo	—	Telemann Portal; Catalogue TWV
TVWV 1	TVWV 1:929	In Christo Jesu gilt weder Beschneidung	13th Sunday after Trinity	SATB with 2 oboes, 2 violins, viola, cello and continuo	—	Telemann Portal; Catalogue TWV
TVWV 1	TVWV 1:930	In Christo Jesu gilt weder Beschneidung	New Year	SATB with 2 oboes, 2 violins, viola, cello and continuo	—	Telemann Portal; Catalogue TWV
TVWV 1	TVWV 1:931	In deinem Wort und Sakrament	1st Sunday after Advent	—	Lost	Telemann Portal; Catalogue TWV
TVWV 1	TVWV 1:932	In dem Namen Jesu wollen sich	Feast of the Epiphany	—	Lost	Telemann Portal; Catalogue TWV
TVWV 1	TVWV 1:933	In Demut gehen	17th Sunday after Trinity	SATB with 2 violins, viola, double bass and continuo	—	Telemann Portal; Catalogue TWV
TVWV 1	TVWV 1:934	In den Seilen deiner Liebe, Jesu, will ich gehen	Easter	TB with 2 oboes, 2 violins, double bass and continuo	—	Telemann Portal; Catalogue TWV
TVWV 1	TVWV 1:935	In der Angst rief ich	21st Sunday after Trinity	—	Lost	Telemann Portal; Catalogue TWV
TVWV 1	TVWV 1:936	In der Welt habet ihr Angst	3rd Sunday after Easter	SATB with 2 oboes, 2 violins, viola, cello and continuo	—	Telemann Portal; Catalogue TWV
TVWV 1	TVWV 1:937	In dich hab ich gehoffet, Herr	23rd Sunday after Trinity	—	Lost	Telemann Portal; Catalogue TWV
TVWV 1	TVWV 1:938	In dich wollst du mich kleiden ein	20th Sunday after Trinity	Solo tenor and SATB with 2 violins, viola, cello and continuo	—	Telemann Portal; Catalogue TWV
TVWV 1	TVWV 1:939	In dulci jubilo	3rd day of Christmas	SATB with 2 oboes, hunting horn, 2 violins, viola, cello and continuo	—	Telemann Portal; Catalogue TWV
TVWV 1	TVWV 1:940	In Ephraim ist allenthalben Lügen wider mich	17th Sunday after Trinity	SATB with oboe, 2 violins, viola, cello and continuo	—	Telemann Portal; Catalogue TWV
TVWV 1	TVWV 1:941	In gering- und rauhen Schalen	1st Sunday after Epiphany	Solo voice with recorder and continuo	—	Telemann Portal; Catalogue TWV
TVWV 1	TVWV 1:942	In Gott vergnügt zu leben	Feast of the Trinity	Solo bass with recorder/oboe, hunting horn, 2 violins, cello and continuo	—	Telemann Portal; Catalogue TWV
TVWV 1	TVWV 1:943	In ihren Bitten sind die meisten	2nd Sunday after Epiphany	—	Lost	Telemann Portal; Catalogue TWV
TVWV 1	TVWV 1:944	Ist auch ein Kreuz bitter und schwer	13th Sunday after Trinity	SATB with 2 oboes, 2 violins, viola, cello and continuo	—	Telemann Portal; Catalogue TWV
TVWV 1	TVWV 1:945	Ist deine Stunde bald zugegen	2nd Sunday after Epiphany	SATB with 2 oboes, 2 violins, viola, cello and continuo	—	Telemann Portal; Catalogue TWV
TVWV 1	TVWV 1:946	Ist Gott versöhnt	New Year	Solo bass and SATB with 2 violins, viola, cello and continuo	—	Telemann Portal; Catalogue TWV
TVWV 1	TVWV 1:947	Ist gleich der Glaube schwach und klein	11th Sunday after Trinity	—	Lost	Telemann Portal; Catalogue TWV
TVWV 1	TVWV 1:948	Ist Widerwärtigkeit den Frommen eigen	2nd Sunday after Epiphany	Solo voice with violin and continuo	—	Telemann Portal; Catalogue TWV
TVWV 1	TVWV 1:949	Ja, selig sind, die Gottes Wort hören	Sunday of Sexagesima	SAB with 2 violins, viola and continuo	—	Telemann Portal; Catalogue TWV
TVWV 1	TVWV 1:950	Jauchze, du Tochter Zion	New Year	SSATB with 2 flutes, 2 oboes, 2 trumpets, timpani, 2 violins, viola, cello and continuo	—	Telemann Portal; Catalogue TWV
TVWV 1	TVWV 1:951	Jauchzet dem Herrn, alle Welt	Feast of the Trinity	SATB with oboe, 3 trumpets, timpani, 2 violins, viola, cello and continuo	—	Telemann Portal; Catalogue TWV
TVWV 1	TVWV 1:952	Jauchzet dem Herrn, alle Welt	New Year	Bass solo with 2 bugles and continuo	—	Telemann Portal; Catalogue TWV
TVWV 1	TVWV 1:953	Jauchzet, frohlocket, der Himmel ist offen	2nd day of the Christmas festival	Solo voice with violin and continuo	—	Telemann Portal; Catalogue TWV
TVWV 1	TVWV 1:954	Jauchzet Gott alle Lande	Ascension Day	—	Lost	Telemann Portal; Catalogue TWV
TVWV 1	TVWV 1:955	Jauchzt, ihr Christen, seid vergnügt	3rd day of Easter	Solo voice with violin and continuo	—	Telemann Portal; Catalogue TWV
TVWV 1	TVWV 1:956	Jauchzet, ihr getreuen Herze	Miscellaneous cantatas	ST with violin, cello and continuo	—	Telemann Portal; Catalogue TWV
TVWV 1	TVWV 1:957	Jauchzet, ihr Himmel, freue dich Erde	4th Sunday of Lent	SAB with 2 violins, viola and continuo	—	Telemann Portal; Catalogue TWV
TVWV 1	TVWV 1:958	Jauchzet, ihr Himmel, freue dich, Erde	Feast of the Assumption of Mary	SATB with flute, oboe, bassoon, 2 violins, viola, cello and continuo	—	Telemann Portal; Catalogue TWV
TVWV 1	TVWV 1:959	Jauchzt dem Höchsten, alle Welt	Easter	SATB with 2 oboes, 2 bugles, timpani, 2 violins, viola, cello and continuo	—	Telemann Portal; Catalogue TWV
TVWV 1	TVWV 1:960	Jedermann sei untertan der Obrigkeit	23rd Sunday after Trinity	SATB with 2 oboes, 2 violins, viola, cello and continuo	—	Telemann Portal; Catalogue TWV
TVWV 1	TVWV 1:961	Jedermann sei untertan der Obrigkeit	23rd Sunday after Trinity	—	Lost	Telemann Portal; Catalogue TWV
TVWV 1	TVWV 1:962	Jedermann sei untertan der Obrigkeit	23rd Sunday after Trinity	Solo voice with violin, viola and continuo	—	Telemann Portal; Catalogue TWV
TVWV 1	TVWV 1:962a	Jesu bleibt, wenn viele	Sunday after Christmas	Solo voice with violin, viola and continuo	Version	Catalogue TWV
TVWV 1	TVWV 1:963	Jesu, durch dein Auferstehen	3rd day of Easter	SATB with 2 oboes, bassoon, 2 violins, double bass and continuo	—	Telemann Portal; Catalogue TWV
TVWV 1	TVWV 1:964	Jesu, in deinem Namen bin ich heute	New Year	Solo soprano and SATB with violin, cello and continuo	—	Telemann Portal; Catalogue TWV
TVWV 1	TVWV 1:965	Jesu, meine Freude	13th Sunday after Trinity	SATB with 2 oboes, 2 violins, viola, cello and continuo	—	Telemann Portal; Catalogue TWV
TVWV 1	TVWV 1:966	Jesu, meine Freude	20th Sunday after Trinity	SATB with 4 flutes, 2 oboes, 2 violins, 2 violas, cello and continuo	= TVWV 1:969	Telemann Portal; Catalogue TWV
TVWV 1	TVWV 1:967	Jesu, meine Freude	6th Sunday after Epiphany	SATB with 2 violins, viola, cello and continuo	—	Telemann Portal; Catalogue TWV
TVWV 1	TVWV 1:968	Jesu, meine Freude	Christmas Feast	—	Lost	Telemann Portal; Catalogue TWV
TVWV 1	TVWV 1:969	Jesu, meine Freude	20th Sunday after Trinity	—	= TVWV 1:966	Telemann Portal; Catalogue TWV
TVWV 1	TVWV 1:970	Jesu, meine Freude	Choral cantata	SATB with 2 oboes, 2 bassoons, 2 violins, viola, cello and continuo	—	Telemann Portal; Catalogue TWV
TVWV 1	TVWV 1:971	Jesu, meine Freude	2nd day of the Christmas festival	—	= TVWV 1:972	Telemann Portal; Catalogue TWV
TVWV 1	TVWV 1:972	Jesu, meine Freude	2nd day of the Christmas festival	—	= TVWV 1:971	Telemann Portal; Catalogue TWV
TVWV 1	TVWV 1:973	Jesu, meine Freude	Choral cantata for communion	SATB with 2 oboes, 2 violins, cello and continuo	—	Telemann Portal; Catalogue TWV
TVWV 1	TVWV 1:974	Jesu, meiner Seelen Weide	Miscellaneous cantatas	Solo soprano with 2 flutes, 2 oboes and continuo	—	Telemann Portal; Catalogue TWV
TVWV 1	TVWV 1:974a	Jesu meines Lebens Sonne	3rd Sunday of Advent	Solo soprano and SATB with bassoon, unison violins and continuo	Version	Catalogue TWV
TVWV 1	TVWV 1:975	Jesus Christus ist kommen	3rd day of Easter	SATB with 2 violins, viola and continuo	—	Telemann Portal; Catalogue TWV
TVWV 1	TVWV 1:976	Jesus Christus, unser Heiland	3rd day of Easter	SATB with 2 oboes, 2 violins, 2 violas, cello and continuo	—	Telemann Portal; Catalogue TWV
TVWV 1	TVWV 1:977	Jesus Christus wohnt uns bei	1st Sunday of Lent	SATB with 2 oboes, 2 horns, 2 violins, viola, cello and continuo	—	Telemann Portal; Catalogue TWV
TVWV 1	TVWV 1:978	Jesus, der mein Heiland, lebt	2nd Sunday after Easter	—	Lost	Telemann Portal; Catalogue TWV
TVWV 1	TVWV 1:979	Jesus, der mein Heiland, lebt	2nd day of Easter	—	Lost	Telemann Portal; Catalogue TWV
TVWV 1	TVWV 1:980	Jesus ist der Heilands-Name	Other cantatas (Feast of the Holy Name of Jesus)	SATB with flute, oboe, 2 violins, viola, cello and continuo	—	Telemann Portal; Catalogue TWV
TVWV 1	TVWV 1:981	Jesus ist der Heilands-Name	Other cantatas (Feast of the Holy Name of Jesus)	SATB with 2 flutes, 2 oboes, 2 violins, viola, cello and continuo	—	Telemann Portal; Catalogue TWV
TVWV 1	TVWV 1:981a	Jesus kommt, ihr Teuffel flieht	1st Sunday after Advent	Solo voice with violin, viola and continuo	Version	Catalogue TWV
TVWV 1	TVWV 1:982	Jesus Liebe mich vergnüget	Miscellaneous cantatas	—	—	Telemann Portal; Catalogue TWV
TVWV 1	TVWV 1:983	Jesus liegt in letzten Zügen	Miscellaneous cantatas	—	—	Telemann Portal; Catalogue TWV
TVWV 1	TVWV 1:984	Jesus, meine Zuversicht	Choral cantata	SATB with recorder, transverse flute, oboe, oboe d'amore, horn, 2 violins, viola, cello and continuo	—	Telemann Portal; Catalogue TWV
TVWV 1	TVWV 1:985	Jesus nimmt die Sünder an	Choral cantata	SATB with flute, 2 oboes, 2 violins, viola, cello and continuo	—	Telemann Portal; Catalogue TWV
TVWV 1	TVWV 1:986	Jesus sei mein erstes Wort	5th Sunday after Trinity	SATB with 2 oboes, 2 violins, 2 violas, cello and continuo	—	Telemann Portal; Catalogue TWV
TVWV 1	TVWV 1:987	Jesus tilget alle Sünden	3rd Sunday after Trinity	SATB with 2 violins, viola, double bass and continuo	—	Telemann Portal; Catalogue TWV
TVWV 1	TVWV 1:988	Jesu, wirst du bald erscheinen	26th Sunday after Trinity	SATB with oboe, piccolo bugle, cornet, 3 trumpets, 2 violins, viola, cello and continuo	—	Telemann Portal; Catalogue TWV
TVWV 1	TVWV 1:989	Itzt geht der Lebensfürst zum Tode	Palm Sunday	SATB with 2 oboes, 2 violins, viola, cello and continuo	—	Telemann Portal; Catalogue TWV
TVWV 1	TVWV 1:990	Kann man auch Trauben lesen	8th Sunday after Trinity	SATB with 2 oboes, 2 violins, viola, cello and continuo	—	Telemann Portal; Catalogue TWV
TVWV 1	TVWV 1:990a	Kann euch dieser Donnerschlag	26th Sunday after Trinity	Solo voice with violin, viola and continuo	Version	Catalogue TWV
TVWV 1	TVWV 1:991	Kaum ist der Heiland auf der Erden	New Year	Solo bass with 2 violins, viola, double bass and continuo	—	Telemann Portal; Catalogue TWV
TVWV 1	TVWV 1:991a	Kehret wieder, ihr Ver	3rd day of the feast of Pentecost	Solo voice with violin, viola and continuo	Version	Catalogue TWV
TVWV 1	TVWV 1:992	Kaum wag ich es, dir, Richter, mich zu nahen	19th Sunday after Trinity	SATB with 2 violins, viola, cello and continuo	—	Telemann Portal; Catalogue TWV
TVWV 1	TVWV 1:992b	Kehre wieder, hochgel	1st Sunday after Epiphany	Solo voice with violin, viola and continuo	Version	Catalogue TWV
TVWV 1	TVWV 1:993	Kein Hirt kann so fleißig gehen	3rd Sunday after Trinity	Bass solo and SATB with 2 violins and continuo	—	Telemann Portal; Catalogue TWV
TVWV 1	TVWV 1:994	Kein Vogel kann im weiten Fliegen	10th Sunday after Trinity	Solo voice with flute and continuo	—	Telemann Portal; Catalogue TWV
TVWV 1	TVWV 1:995	Kein Zepter, keine Krone sucht er	1st Sunday after Epiphany	—	Lost	Telemann Portal; Catalogue TWV
TVWV 1	TVWV 1:996	Kinder, es ist die letzte Stunde	27th Sunday after Trinity	—	Lost	Telemann Portal; Catalogue TWV
TVWV 1	TVWV 1:997	Kinder, es ist die letzte Stunde	8th Sunday after Trinity	SATB with 2 oboes, 2 violins, viola, cello and continuo	—	Telemann Portal; Catalogue TWV
TVWV 1	TVWV 1:998	Kommt herzu, lasset uns dem Herrn frohlocken	14th Sunday after Trinity	SATB with 2 oboes, 2 violins, viola, cello and continuo	—	Telemann Portal; Catalogue TWV
TVWV 1	TVWV 1:999	Komm, Geist des Herrn	Feast of Pentecost	SATB with 2 oboes, 3 trumpets, 2 violins, viola, cello and continuo	—	Telemann Portal; Catalogue TWV
TVWV 1	TVWV 1:1000	Komm, Gnadentau, befeuchte mich	Feast of Pentecost	SAATTBBB with 2 flutes, 3 trumpets, timpani, 2 violins, viola and continuo	—	Telemann Portal; Catalogue TWV
TVWV 1	TVWV 1:1001	Komm, heiliger Geist, Herr Gott	Feast of Pentecost	SATB with flute, 2 oboes, 4 trumpets, timpani, 2 violins, viola, cello and continuo	—	Telemann Portal; Catalogue TWV
TVWV 1	TVWV 1:1002	Komm, heiliger Geist, Herr Gott	Feast of Pentecost	—	Lost	Telemann Portal; Catalogue TWV
TVWV 1	TVWV 1:1003	Kommt alle, die ihr traurig seid	3rd Sunday after Epiphany	SATB with 2 oboes, 2 violins, viola, cello and continuo	—	Telemann Portal; Catalogue TWV
TVWV 1	TVWV 1:1004	Kommt alle, die von so manchem Sündenfalle verwundet	3rd Sunday after Trinity	SATB with 2 oboes, 2 violins, 2 violas, cello and continuo	—	Telemann Portal; Catalogue TWV
TVWV 1	TVWV 1:1005	Kommt, Christen, lasst uns Christum fragen	3rd Sunday of Advent	SATB with 2 violins, viola, cello and continuo	—	Telemann Portal; Catalogue TWV
TVWV 1	TVWV 1:1006	Kommt, die Tafel steht gedeckt	2nd Sunday after Trinity	SATB with 2 violins, viola, cello and continuo	—	Telemann Portal; Catalogue TWV
TVWV 1	TVWV 1:1007	Kommt her zu mir alle, die ihr mühselig und beladen seid	2nd Sunday after Trinity	SATB with 2 oboes, 2 violins, viola, cello and continuo	—	Telemann Portal; Catalogue TWV
TVWV 1	TVWV 1:1008	Kommt her zu mir alle, die ihr mühselig und beladen seid	2nd Sunday after Trinity	SATB with 2 oboes, 2 violins, viola, cello and continuo	—	Telemann Portal; Catalogue TWV
TVWV 1	TVWV 1:1009	Kommt herzu, lasset uns	Miscellaneous cantatas	SATB with 2 violins, viola, cello and continuo	—	Telemann Portal; Catalogue TWV
TVWV 1	TVWV 1:1010	Kommt, ihr Schäflein, lasst euch weiden	2nd Sunday after Easter	SATB with flute, 2 oboes, 2 violins, viola, cello and continuo	—	Telemann Portal; Catalogue TWV
TVWV 1	TVWV 1:1011	Kommt, ihr Sünder, kommt heran	3rd Sunday after Trinity	—	Lost	Telemann Portal; Catalogue TWV
TVWV 1	TVWV 1:1012	Kommt, lasst uns anbeten	3rd day of the feast of Pentecost	SATB with 2 violins, viola, cello and continuo	—	Telemann Portal; Catalogue TWV
TVWV 1	TVWV 1:1013	Kommt und lasst uns Jesum lehren	18th Sunday after Trinity	Bass solo and SATB with 2 violins, viola and continuo	—	Telemann Portal; Catalogue TWV
TVWV 1	TVWV 1:1014	Kommt, verruchte Sodoms-Knechte	10th Sunday after Trinity	SB with 2 oboes, 4 bassoons, 2 violins, viola and continuo	—	Telemann Portal; Catalogue TWV
TVWV 1	TVWV 1:1014a	Krache, mimke, morsche Hutte	16th Sunday after Trinity	Solo voice with violin, viola and continuo	Version	Catalogue TWV
TVWV 1	TVWV 1:1014b	Kruftiges Wort, voll Heil	12th Sunday after Trinity	Solo voice with violin, viola and continuo	Version	Catalogue TWV
TVWV 1	TVWV 1:1015	Kränke dich nur nicht, mein	Sunday after Christmas	—	Lost	Telemann Portal; Catalogue TWV
TVWV 1	TVWV 1:1016	Kreuz, Verfolgung, Blut und Mord	Sunday after Ascension Day	—	Lost	Telemann Portal; Catalogue TWV
TVWV 1	TVWV 1:1017	Kündlich groß ist das gottselige Geheimnis	3rd day of Christmas	SATB with 2 oboes, 2 violins, viola, cello and continuo	—	Telemann Portal; Catalogue TWV
TVWV 1	TVWV 1:1018	Kündlich groß ist das gottselige Geheimnis	2nd day of the Christmas festival	—	Lost	Telemann Portal; Catalogue TWV
TVWV 1	TVWV 1:1019	Kündlich groß ist das gottselige Geheimnis	Christmas Feast	SATB with 2 oboes, 2 violins, viola, cello and continuo	—	Telemann Portal; Catalogue TWV
TVWV 1	TVWV 1:1020	Kündlich groß ist das gottselige Geheimnis	Christmas Feast	SATB with 2 oboes, 3 trumpets, timpani, 2 violins, viola, cello and continuo	—	Telemann Portal; Catalogue TWV
TVWV 1	TVWV 1:1021	Lasset das Wort Christi unter euch reichlich wohnen	5th Sunday after Epiphany	—	Lost	Telemann Portal; Catalogue TWV
TVWV 1	TVWV 1:1022	Lasset mich voll Freude sprechen	4th Sunday of Advent	—	Lost	Telemann Portal; Catalogue TWV
TVWV 1	TVWV 1:1023	Lasset uns aufsehen auf Jesum	Sunday of Quinquagesima	SATB with 2 oboes, 2 violins, viola, cello and continuo	—	Telemann Portal; Catalogue TWV
TVWV 1	TVWV 1:1024	Lasset uns beweisen als die Diener Gottes	Sunday after Ascension Day	SATB with 2 oboes, 2 violins, viola, cello and continuo	—	Telemann Portal; Catalogue TWV
TVWV 1	TVWV 1:1025	Lasset uns den Herrn preisen	1st Sunday after Easter	SATB with 2 trombones, timpani, 2 violins, viola, cello and continuo	—	Telemann Portal; Catalogue TWV
TVWV 1	TVWV 1:1026	Lasset uns Gott lieben	18th Sunday after Trinity	SATB with 2 oboes, 2 violins, viola, cello and continuo	—	Telemann Portal; Catalogue TWV
TVWV 1	TVWV 1:1027	Lasset uns Gott lieben	3rd day of the feast of Pentecost	SATB with 2 oboes, 2 violins, viola and continuo	—	Telemann Portal; Catalogue TWV
TVWV 1	TVWV 1:1028	Lasset uns nicht eitler Ehre geizig sein	17th Sunday after Trinity	SATB with 2 oboes, 2 bassoons, 2 violins, viola, cello and continuo	—	Telemann Portal; Catalogue TWV
TVWV 1	TVWV 1:1029	Lasset uns rechtschaffen sein	1st Sunday after Epiphany	SATB with 2 oboes, 2 bassoons, 2 violins, viola, cello and continuo	—	Telemann Portal; Catalogue TWV
TVWV 1	TVWV 1:1030	Lasset uns rechtschaffen sein	5th Sunday after Epiphany	—	Lost	Telemann Portal; Catalogue TWV
TVWV 1	TVWV 1:1031	Lasset uns von Gott singen	Choral cantata for communion	SB with violin, cello and continuo	—	Telemann Portal; Catalogue TWV
TVWV 1	TVWV 1:1032	Lasset uns zu Gottes Hause kehren	1st Sunday after Epiphany	—	Lost	Telemann Portal; Catalogue TWV
TVWV 1	TVWV 1:1033	Lass mich an andern üben	24th Sunday after Trinity	Solo bass with 2 oboes, 2 violins, viola and continuo	—	Telemann Portal; Catalogue TWV
TVWV 1	TVWV 1:1034	Lass mich beizeit mein Haus bestellen	Feast of the Trinity	Solo tenor and SATB with 2 violins, viola, cello and continuo	—	Telemann Portal; Catalogue TWV
TVWV 1	TVWV 1:1035	Lass mich durch deine Nägelmahl	1st Sunday after Easter	—	Lost	Telemann Portal; Catalogue TWV
TVWV 1	TVWV 1:1036	Lasst uns eins ums ander singen	Miscellaneous cantatas	—	—	Telemann Portal; Catalogue TWV
TVWV 1	TVWV 1:1037	Lass mich, o mein Gott	7th Sunday after Trinity	Solo bass and SATB with 2 violins, viola, cello and continuo	—	Telemann Portal; Catalogue TWV
TVWV 1	TVWV 1:1037a	Lass uns in deine Liebe	2nd Sunday after Epiphany	Soprano solo and SATB with 2 violins, cello and continuo	Cantata Excerpt	Catalogue TWV
TVWV 1	TVWV 1:1037b	Lass uns in deiner Liebe	4th Sunday of Advent	Soprano solo and SATB with continuo	Cantata Excerpt	Catalogue TWV
TVWV 1	TVWV 1:1038	Lass vom Bösen und tue Gutes	4th Sunday after Epiphany	SATB with 2 oboes, 2 violins, viola, cello and continuo	—	Telemann Portal; Catalogue TWV
TVWV 1	TVWV 1:1039	Lass Weisheit und Verstand	1st Sunday after Epiphany	—	Lost	Telemann Portal; Catalogue TWV
TVWV 1	TVWV 1:1040	Lauter Wonne, lauter Freude	4th Sunday of Advent	Solo voice with recorder and continuo	—	Telemann Portal; Catalogue TWV
TVWV 1	TVWV 1:1040a	Lebendiger Gott, dein Wort	Sunday of Sexagesima	Solo voice with violin, viola and continuo	Version	Catalogue TWV
TVWV 1	TVWV 1:1040b	Lebensfurst, auf dein Erblassen	Easter	Solo voice with violin, viola and continuo	Version	Catalogue TWV
TVWV 1	TVWV 1:1041	Leben wir, so leben wir dem Herrn	Feast of the Purification of Mary	SATB with 2 flutes, 2 oboes, bassoon, 2 violins, viola, cello and continuo	—	Telemann Portal; Catalogue TWV
TVWV 1	TVWV 1:1042	Lehre uns bedenken, dass wir sterben müssen	9th Sunday after Trinity	SAB with 2 violins, viola and continuo	—	Telemann Portal; Catalogue TWV
TVWV 1	TVWV 1:1043	Lehre uns bedenken, dass wir sterben müssen	27th Sunday after Trinity	SAB with 2 violins, viola, cello and continuo	—	Telemann Portal; Catalogue TWV
TVWV 1	TVWV 1:1044	Liebe, die vom Himmel stammet	5th Sunday after Epiphany	Solo voice with violin and continuo	—	Telemann Portal; Catalogue TWV
TVWV 1	TVWV 1:1045	Liebe, Liebe muss der Christen Merkmal sein	13th Sunday after Trinity	SATB with 2 oboes, 2 violins, viola, cello and continuo	—	Telemann Portal; Catalogue TWV
TVWV 1	TVWV 1:1046	Liebet eure Feinde, segnet	6th Sunday after Trinity	SATB with 2 oboes, 2 violins, viola, cello and continuo	—	Telemann Portal; Catalogue TWV
TVWV 1	TVWV 1:1047	Liebet eure Feinde	4th Sunday after Trinity	SATB with 2 oboes, 2 violins, viola, cello and continuo	—	Telemann Portal; Catalogue TWV
TVWV 1	TVWV 1:1048	Lieblicher Saiten ergötzendes Schallen	4th Sunday of Advent	SATB with 2 flutes/oboe, 2 violins, viola, cello and continuo	—	Telemann Portal; Catalogue TWV
TVWV 1	TVWV 1:1049	Liebster Heiland, dein Verlangen	10th Sunday after Trinity	—	Lost	Telemann Portal; Catalogue TWV
TVWV 1	TVWV 1:1050	Liebster Jesu, deine Liebe	25th Sunday after Trinity	—	Lost	Telemann Portal; Catalogue TWV
TVWV 1	TVWV 1:1051	Liebster Jesu, kehre wieder	1st Sunday after Epiphany	Solo bass with 2 flutes, 2 violins, viola, cello and continuo	—	Telemann Portal; Catalogue TWV
TVWV 1	TVWV 1:1052	Liebster Jesu, meine Lust	18th Sunday after Trinity	SATB with 2 oboes, bassoon, 2 violins, viola, cello and continuo	—	Telemann Portal; Catalogue TWV
TVWV 1	TVWV 1:1053	Lobe den Herrn, meine Seele, Halleluja	Feast of the Visitation of Mary	SATB with 2 bugles, 2 violins, 2 violas, cello and continuo	—	Telemann Portal; Catalogue TWV
TVWV 1	TVWV 1:1054	Lobe den Herrn, meine Seele, und was in mir ist	12th Sunday after Trinity	SATB with 2 oboes, 2 violins, viola, cello and continuo	—	Telemann Portal; Catalogue TWV
TVWV 1	TVWV 1:1055	Lobe den Herrn, mein Seele	Feast of the Epiphany	—	Lost	Telemann Portal; Catalogue TWV
TVWV 1	TVWV 1:1056	Lob den Herrn, meine Seele	7th Sunday after Trinity	SB with 2 violins, viola and continuo	—	Telemann Portal; Catalogue TWV
TVWV 1	TVWV 1:1057	Lob, Ehr und Preis sei Gott	Feast of St. Michael	SATB with flute, oboe, 3 trumpets, timpani, principal violin, 2 violins, viola, cello and continuo	—	Telemann Portal; Catalogue TWV
TVWV 1	TVWV 1:1058	Lobet den Herrn, alle Heiden	Feast of the Epiphany	SATB with 2 oboes, 2 violins, viola, cello and continuo	—	Telemann Portal; Catalogue TWV
TVWV 1	TVWV 1:1059	Lobet den Herrn, alle Heiden	Feast of the Epiphany	SAB with 3 bugles, timpani, 2 violins, viola and continuo	—	Telemann Portal; Catalogue TWV
TVWV 1	TVWV 1:1060	Lobet den Herrn, alle Heiden	Feast of St. John the Baptist	SAB with 2 violins, viola and continuo	—	Telemann Portal; Catalogue TWV
TVWV 1	TVWV 1:1061	Lobet den Herrn, alle seine Heerscharen	New Year	SATB with 2 oboes, 3 piccolo bugles, timpani, 2 violins, viola, cello and continuo	—	Telemann Portal; Catalogue TWV
TVWV 1	TVWV 1:1062	Lobet den Herrn, ihr seine Engel	16th Sunday after Trinity	—	Lost	Telemann Portal; Catalogue TWV
TVWV 1	TVWV 1:1063	Lobet den Herrn, ihr seine Engel	Feast of St. Michael	SATB with 2 flutes, 2 oboes, 2 trumpets, timpani, 2 violins, viola, cello and continuo	—	Telemann Portal; Catalogue TWV
TVWV 1	TVWV 1:1064	Lobsingt dem Herrn	New Year	SATB with 2 oboes, 2 violins, viola, cello and continuo	—	Telemann Portal; Catalogue TWV
TVWV 1	TVWV 1:1065	Lobsinget dem Herrn	Feast of the Visitation of Mary	—	Lost	Telemann Portal; Catalogue TWV
TVWV 1	TVWV 1:1066	Lobt Gott, ihr Christen allzugleich	Christmas Feast	SATB with 2 oboes, 2 bugles, 3 trombones, timpani, 2 violins, viola, cello and continuo	—	Telemann Portal; Catalogue TWV
TVWV 1	TVWV 1:1067	Lobt ihn mit Herz und Munde	Feast of the Visitation of Mary	Solo bass and SATB with 2 violins, viola, cello and continuo	—	Telemann Portal; Catalogue TWV
TVWV 1	TVWV 1:1068	Lobt, ihr Engel, insgemein	Feast of St. Michael	—	Lost	Telemann Portal; Catalogue TWV
TVWV 1	TVWV 1:1069	Locke nur, Erde, mit schmeichelndem Reize	23rd Sunday after Trinity	Solo voice with recorder and continuo	—	Telemann Portal; Catalogue TWV
TVWV 1	TVWV 1:1070	Mache dich auf, werde Licht	Christmas Feast	SATB with 3 bugles, 2 violins, viola and continuo	—	Telemann Portal; Catalogue TWV
TVWV 1	TVWV 1:1071	Mach dich auf, werde Licht	Feast of the Epiphany	—	Lost	Telemann Portal; Catalogue TWV
TVWV 1	TVWV 1:1072	Mache dich auf, werde Licht	Feast of the Epiphany	SATB with oboe, bassoon, 2 violins, viola, 2 cellos and continuo	—	Telemann Portal; Catalogue TWV
TVWV 1	TVWV 1:1073	Machet Bahn dem, der da sanft herfähret	Feast of Pentecost	SATB with 2 transverse flutes, 2 oboes, 2 bugles, 2 violins, viola and continuo	—	Telemann Portal; Catalogue TWV
TVWV 1	TVWV 1:1074	Machet die Tore weit	1st Sunday after Advent	SATB with 2 oboes, 2 violins, viola, cello and continuo	—	Telemann Portal; Catalogue TWV
TVWV 1	TVWV 1:1075	Machet die Tore weit	1st Sunday after Advent	SATB with 2 flutes, 2 oboes, bugle, horn, 2 violins, viola, cello and continuo	—	Telemann Portal; Catalogue TWV
TVWV 1	TVWV 1:1076	Machet euch Freunde mit dem ungerechten Mammon	9th Sunday after Trinity	SATB with 2 violins, viola, cello and continuo	—	Telemann Portal; Catalogue TWV
TVWV 1	TVWV 1:1077	Machet euch Freunde mit dem ungerechten Mammon	9th Sunday after Trinity	SATB with 2 oboes, 2 violins, viola, cello and continuo	—	Telemann Portal; Catalogue TWV
TVWV 1	TVWV 1:1078	Machet keusch eure Seelen	Sunday of Sexagesima	SATB with 2 oboes, 2 violins, viola, cello and continuo	—	Telemann Portal; Catalogue TWV
TVWV 1	TVWV 1:1079	Mach mich an meiner Seele reich	15th Sunday after Trinity	SATB with 2 violins, viola, cello and continuo	—	Telemann Portal; Catalogue TWV
TVWV 1	TVWV 1:1080	Mach mir stets zuckersüß	2nd Sunday after Trinity	Solo soprano and SATB with 2 violins, viola, cello and continuo	—	Telemann Portal; Catalogue TWV
TVWV 1	TVWV 1:1080a	Machtiger Heiland	2nd day of the Christmas festival	Solo voice with violin, viola and continuo	Version	Catalogue TWV
TVWV 1	TVWV 1:1081	Man bete, wie uns Jesus lehret	Rogation Festival	—	Lost	Telemann Portal; Catalogue TWV
TVWV 1	TVWV 1:1082	Man muss nicht zu sehr trauren	24th Sunday after Trinity	SATB with 2 oboes, 2 violins, viola, cello and continuo	—	Telemann Portal; Catalogue TWV
TVWV 1	TVWV 1:1083	Man schicke sich in Gottes Wille	3rd Sunday after Epiphany	—	Lost	Telemann Portal; Catalogue TWV
TVWV 1	TVWV 1:1084	Man singet mit Freuden vom Sieg	1st Sunday of Lent	SATB with 2 oboes, 2 bugles, timpani, 2 violins, viola, cello and continuo	—	Telemann Portal; Catalogue TWV
TVWV 1	TVWV 1:1085	Man singet mit Freuden vom Sieg	Easter	—	Lost	Telemann Portal; Catalogue TWV
TVWV 1	TVWV 1:1086	Man singet mit Freuden vom Sieg	Easter	SSATB with 3 trumpets, timpani, 2 violins, viola, cello and continuo	—	Telemann Portal; Catalogue TWV
TVWV 1	TVWV 1:1087	Man singet mit Freuden vom Sieg	Easter	SATB with 3 trumpets, timpani, 2 violins, viola and continuo	—	Telemann Portal; Catalogue TWV
TVWV 1	TVWV 1:1088	Man singet mit Freuden vom Sieg	Easter	SATB with 2 oboes, bassoon, 3 bugles, timpani, 2 violins, viola, cello and continuo	—	Telemann Portal; Catalogue TWV
TVWV 1	TVWV 1:1089	Maria stund auf in den Tagen	Feast of the Visitation of Mary	SATB with 2 oboes, 2 violins, viola, cello and continuo	—	Telemann Portal; Catalogue TWV
TVWV 1	TVWV 1:1090	Mein Alter kömmt, ich kann nicht sterben	Feast of the Purification of Mary	SATB with 2 violins, viola, cello and continuo	—	Telemann Portal; Catalogue TWV
TVWV 1	TVWV 1:1091	Mein Christe stellet sich bei dir	7th Sunday after Trinity	—	Lost	Telemann Portal; Catalogue TWV
TVWV 1	TVWV 1:1092	Meine Angst des Herzens ist unsäglich	19th Sunday after Trinity	—	Lost	Telemann Portal; Catalogue TWV
TVWV 1	TVWV 1:1093	Meine Augen sehen stets zu dem Herrn	3rd Sunday of Lent	SAB with 2 violins, viola and continuo	—	Telemann Portal; Catalogue TWV
TVWV 1	TVWV 1:1094	Meine Brüder, seid stark in dem Herrn	3rd Sunday of Lent	SATB with 2 oboes, 2 violins, viola and continuo	—	Telemann Portal; Catalogue TWV
TVWV 1	TVWV 1:1095	Meine Liebe lebt in Gott	2nd day of the feast of Pentecost	Solo baritone with oboe, violin, cello and continuo	—	Telemann Portal; Catalogue TWV
TVWV 1	TVWV 1:1096	Meinem Jesum will ich singen	3rd Sunday after Easter	SATB with flute, 2 violins, viola and continuo	—	Telemann Portal; Catalogue TWV
TVWV 1	TVWV 1:1097	Meinen Jesum lass ich nicht	Feast of the Purification of Mary	SATB with 2 oboes, bassoon 2 violins, viola, cello and continuo	—	Telemann Portal; Catalogue TWV
TVWV 1	TVWV 1:1098	Meinen Jesum will ich lieben	Feast of the Purification of Mary	SATB with 2 oboes, hunting horn, 2 violins, viola and continuo	—	Telemann Portal; Catalogue TWV
TVWV 1	TVWV 1:1099	Meine Rede bleibt betrübt	Miscellaneous cantatas	—	—	Telemann Portal; Catalogue TWV
TVWV 1	TVWV 1:1100	Meines Bleibens ist nicht hier	2nd day of Easter	SATB with 2 oboes, 2 violins, viola, cello and continuo	—	Telemann Portal; Catalogue TWV
TVWV 1	TVWV 1:1101	Meines Bleibens ist nicht hier	2nd day of Easter	Solo viola with 2 violins and continuo	—	Telemann Portal; Catalogue TWV
TVWV 1	TVWV 1:1102	Meine Schafe hören meine Stimme	2nd Sunday after Easter	SATB with concertante oboe, 2 violins, viola, cello, double bass and continuo	—	Telemann Portal; Catalogue TWV
TVWV 1	TVWV 1:1103	Meine Schafe hören meine Stimme	2nd Sunday after Easter	SAB with 2 violins, viola and continuo	—	Telemann Portal; Catalogue TWV
TVWV 1	TVWV 1:1104	Meine Seele erhebt den Herrn	Feast of the Visitation of Mary	SATB with 2 oboes, 2 violins, viola, cello and continuo	—	Telemann Portal; Catalogue TWV
TVWV 1	TVWV 1:1105	Meine Seele erhebt den Herrn	Feast of the Assumption of Mary	SATB with 2 oboes, 2 violins, viola, cello and continuo	—	Telemann Portal; Catalogue TWV
TVWV 1	TVWV 1:1106	Meine Seele erhebt den Herrn	Feast of the Assumption of Mary	SATB with 2 violins, viola and continuo	—	Telemann Portal; Catalogue TWV
TVWV 1	TVWV 1:1107	Meine Seele erhebt den Herrn	Feast of the Visitation of Mary	Solo voice with violin, viola and continuo	—	Telemann Portal; Catalogue TWV
TVWV 1	TVWV 1:1108	Meine Seele erhebt den Herrn	Feast of the Visitation of Mary	SAB with 2 violins, viola and continuo	—	Telemann Portal; Catalogue TWV
TVWV 1	TVWV 1:1109	Meine Seele harret nur auf Gott	2nd Sunday of Lent	SATB with 2 flutes, 2 oboes, 2 bassoons, 2 violins, viola, cello and continuo	—	Telemann Portal; Catalogue TWV
TVWV 1	TVWV 1:1110	Meine Seele trägt Verlangen	Sunday after Ascension Day	SATB with unison violins, cello and continuo	—	Telemann Portal; Catalogue TWV
TVWV 1	TVWV 1:1110a	Mein Freud ist mein	2nd Sunday after Epiphany	Solo voice with violin, viola and continuo	Version	Catalogue TWV
TVWV 1	TVWV 1:1111	Mein Glaubenslicht ist schwach	1st Sunday after Easter	—	Lost	Telemann Portal; Catalogue TWV
TVWV 1	TVWV 1:1111a	Mein Glaube ringt in letzten Zugen	3rd Sunday of Advent	Solo voice with 2 flutes and continuo	Version	Catalogue TWV
TVWV 1	TVWV 1:1112	Mein Gott, ich bin gesinnt	7th Sunday after Trinity	SB with oboe d'amore, unison violins, cello and continuo	—	Telemann Portal; Catalogue TWV
TVWV 1	TVWV 1:1113	Mein Gott, ich habe missgehandelt	13th Sunday after Trinity	—	Lost	Telemann Portal; Catalogue TWV
TVWV 1	TVWV 1:1114	Mein Gott! ich schäme mich	22nd Sunday after Trinity	SATB with 2 oboes, 2 violins, viola, cello and continuo	—	Telemann Portal; Catalogue TWV
TVWV 1	TVWV 1:1115	Mein Herz ängstet sich	1st Sunday after Easter	SATB with 2 flutes, 2 oboes, 2 violins, 2 violas, cello and continuo	—	Telemann Portal; Catalogue TWV
TVWV 1	TVWV 1:1116	Mein Herze heg Barmherzigkeit	4th Sunday after Trinity	SATB with oboe, 2 violins, viola, cello and continuo	—	Telemann Portal; Catalogue TWV
TVWV 1	TVWV 1:1116a	Hein Herze muss an Freuden	Feast of the Visitation of Mary	Solo voice with violin, viola and continuo	Version	Catalogue TWV
TVWV 1	TVWV 1:1117	Mein Herz, warum betrübst du dich	2nd Sunday after Epiphany	—	—	Telemann Portal; Catalogue TWV
TVWV 1	TVWV 1:1118	Mein Herz, was kränkest du dich	15th Sunday after Trinity	—	—	Telemann Portal; Catalogue TWV
TVWV 1	TVWV 1:1119	Mein Jesu, ist dir's denn verborgen	2nd Sunday after Epiphany	SATB with 2 oboes, 2 violins, viola, cello and continuo	—	Telemann Portal; Catalogue TWV
TVWV 1	TVWV 1:1120	Mein Jesu, meines Herzens Freude	3rd day of the feast of Pentecost	Solo tenor with violin and continuo	—	Telemann Portal; Catalogue TWV
TVWV 1	TVWV 1:1121	Mein Jesus ist des Herzens Weide	4th Sunday after Easter	—	Lost	Telemann Portal; Catalogue TWV
TVWV 1	TVWV 1:1122	Mein Jesus ist mein Leben	Miscellaneous cantatas	Soprano or Tenor solo with violin and continuo	—	Telemann Portal; Catalogue TWV
TVWV 1	TVWV 1:1123	Mein Jesus ist mein treuer Hirt	2nd Sunday after Easter	SATB with 2 flutes/oboe with 2 violins, viola, cello and continuo	—	Telemann Portal; Catalogue TWV
TVWV 1	TVWV 1:1124	Mein Jesus nimmt die Kranken an	3rd Sunday of Advent	Bass solo and SATB with 2 violins, viola and continuo	—	Telemann Portal; Catalogue TWV
TVWV 1	TVWV 1:1125	Mein Jesus starb und lebt durch sich	Easter	SATB with bassoon, 2 hunting horns, 2 violins, viola, double bass and continuo	—	Telemann Portal; Catalogue TWV
TVWV 1	TVWV 1:1126	Mein Jesus wird gewisslich kommen	2nd Sunday of Advent	—	Lost	Telemann Portal; Catalogue TWV
TVWV 1	TVWV 1:1127	Mein Jesus wirft mit voller Hand	Sunday of Sexagesima	SATB,SATB with 2 violins, viola and continuo	—	Telemann Portal; Catalogue TWV
TVWV 1	TVWV 1:1128	Mein Kind, verwirf die Zucht des Herrn nicht	21st Sunday after Trinity	SATB with 2 oboes, 2 violins, viola, cello and continuo	—	Telemann Portal; Catalogue TWV
TVWV 1	TVWV 1:1129	Mein Kind, willtu Gottes Diener sein	3rd Sunday of Advent	SATB with 2 oboes, 2 violins, viola, cello and continuo	—	Telemann Portal; Catalogue TWV
TVWV 1	TVWV 1:1130	Mein Kind, willt du Gottes Diener sein	3rd Sunday of Advent	SATB with 2 oboes, 2 violins, viola, double bass and continuo	—	Telemann Portal; Catalogue TWV
TVWV 1	TVWV 1:1131	Mein lieber Gott allein	2nd Sunday after Easter	SATB with 2 violins, viola, double bass and continuo	—	Telemann Portal; Catalogue TWV
TVWV 1	TVWV 1:1132	Mein Schutz und Hülfe kömmt	19th Sunday after Trinity	Solo viola and SATB with 2 violins, viola, cello and continuo	—	Telemann Portal; Catalogue TWV
TVWV 1	TVWV 1:1133	Dein Schade ist verzweifelt böse	Miscellaneous cantatas	—	—	Telemann Portal; Catalogue TWV
TVWV 1	TVWV 1:1134	Mein Sünd mich werden kränken sehr	19th Sunday after Trinity	SATB with 2 oboes, 2 violins, viola, cello and continuo	—	Telemann Portal; Catalogue TWV
TVWV 1	TVWV 1:1135	Me miserum miseriarum conflictu	Miscellaneous cantatas	Solo viola with 2 violins, cello and continuo	—	Telemann Portal; Catalogue TWV
TVWV 1	TVWV 1:1136	Michael, wer ist wie Gott	Feast of St. Michael	SATB with 2 oboes, 2 trumpets, timpani, 2 violins, viola, cello and continuo	—	Telemann Portal; Catalogue TWV
TVWV 1	TVWV 1:1137	Mir hat die Welt trüglich gericht mit Lügen	17th Sunday after Trinity	SATB with 2 oboes, 2 hunting horns, 2 violins, viola, cello and continuo	—	Telemann Portal; Catalogue TWV
TVWV 1	TVWV 1:1138	Mir hat die Welt trüglich gericht mit Lügen	3rd Sunday of Lent	Solo soprano and SATB with 2 violins, viola, cello and continuo	—	Telemann Portal; Catalogue TWV
TVWV 1	TVWV 1:1139	Mir stehet keine Weltlust an	Ascension Day	SATB with 2 violins, viola, double bass and continuo	—	Telemann Portal; Catalogue TWV
TVWV 1	TVWV 1:1140	Mit Fried und Freud ich fahr dahin	Feast of the Purification of Mary	SATB with 2 violins, viola, double bass and continuo	—	Telemann Portal; Catalogue TWV
TVWV 1	TVWV 1:1141	Mit Gott im Gnadenbunde stehen	3rd Sunday after Epiphany	SB solo with 2 oboes, 2 chalumeaux, 2 horns, bells, 2 violins, viola, cello and continuo	—	Telemann Portal; Catalogue TWV
TVWV 1	TVWV 1:1142	Mit Gott im Gnadenbunde stehen	4th Sunday after Easter	—	Lost	Telemann Portal; Catalogue TWV
TVWV 1	TVWV 1:1143	Mitten unter den Gedanken	3rd day of Easter	—	Lost	Telemann Portal; Catalogue TWV
TVWV 1	TVWV 1:1144	Möcht ich, Jesu, mein Amt verwalten	Feast of Pentecost	SATB with flute, oboe, 2 trumpets, timpani, 2 violins, viola, cello and continuo	—	Telemann Portal; Catalogue TWV
TVWV 1	TVWV 1:1145	Muntre Gedanken, fliehet der Wollust	Feast of the Epiphany	Solo voice with 2 flutes and continuo	—	Telemann Portal; Catalogue TWV
TVWV 1	TVWV 1:1146	Muss nicht der Mensch immer im Streit sein	1st Sunday of Lent	SATB with 2 oboes, 2 violins, viola, cello and continuo	—	Telemann Portal; Catalogue TWV
TVWV 1	TVWV 1:1147	Nach ausgelöschtem Feindschafts-Feuer	3rd day of Easter	Solo voice with violin, viola and continuo	—	Telemann Portal; Catalogue TWV
TVWV 1	TVWV 1:1148	Nach dem Weinen, nach dem Leiden	3rd Sunday after Easter	SATB with 2 oboes, 2 violins, viola, cello and continuo	—	Telemann Portal; Catalogue TWV
TVWV 1	TVWV 1:1149	Nach dir will ich mich sehnen	4th Sunday after Easter	SATB with 2 violins, viola, cello and continuo	—	Telemann Portal; Catalogue TWV
TVWV 1	TVWV 1:1150	Nach Finsternis und Todesschatten	Feast of St. John the Baptist	Solo voice with oboe/trombone, violin and continuo	—	Telemann Portal; Catalogue TWV
TVWV 1	TVWV 1:1151	Nach seiner Barmherzigkeit	Feast of the Trinity	—	Lost	Telemann Portal; Catalogue TWV
TVWV 1	TVWV 1:1152	Nehmt hin, ihr Reichen dieser Welt	1st Sunday after Trinity	STB with 2 violins, viola, cello and continuo	—	Telemann Portal; Catalogue TWV
TVWV 1	TVWV 1:1153	Nichts, nichts kann mich verdammen	1st Sunday of Lent	Solo tenor and SATB with 2 violins, viola, cello and continuo	—	Telemann Portal; Catalogue TWV
TVWV 1	TVWV 1:1154	Nicht über eine kleine Weile	27th Sunday after Trinity	—	Lost	Telemann Portal; Catalogue TWV
TVWV 1	TVWV 1:1155	Nicht uns, Herr, nicht uns	4th Sunday of Advent	—	Lost	Telemann Portal; Catalogue TWV
TVWV 1	TVWV 1:1156	Nicht viel Weise nach dem Fleisch	Septuagesima Sunday	SATB with 2 oboes, 2 violins, viola, cello and continuo	—	Telemann Portal; Catalogue TWV
TVWV 1	TVWV 1:1157	Niedrigkeit ist ein Spott	Sunday after Christmas	SATB with 2 flutes, 2 oboes, 2 violins, viola, cello and continuo	—	Telemann Portal; Catalogue TWV
TVWV 1	TVWV 1:1158	Niemand kann in'n Himmel kommen	Ascension Day	—	Lost	Telemann Portal; Catalogue TWV
TVWV 1	TVWV 1:1159	Nimm von uns, Herr, du treuer Gott	10th Sunday after Trinity	SATB with 2 oboes, 2 violins, viola, cello and continuo	—	Telemann Portal; Catalogue TWV
TVWV 1	TVWV 1:1160	Nimm nicht zu Herzen, was die Rotten	18th Sunday after Trinity	SATB with 2 flutes/oboe, 2 violins, viola, cello and continuo	—	Telemann Portal; Catalogue TWV
TVWV 1	TVWV 1:1161	Nun aber, die ihr in Christo Jesu seid	1st Sunday after Easter	SATB with 2 oboes, 2 violins, viola, cello and continuo	—	Telemann Portal; Catalogue TWV
TVWV 1	TVWV 1:1162	Nun aber gehe ich hin	4th Sunday after Easter	SATB with 2 violins, viola, cello and continuo	—	Telemann Portal; Catalogue TWV
TVWV 1	TVWV 1:1163	Nun aber gehe ich hin	4th Sunday after Easter	SATB with flute, 2 oboes, 2 violins, viola, cello and continuo	= TVWV 1:1164	Telemann Portal; Catalogue TWV
TVWV 1	TVWV 1:1164	Nun aber gehe ich hin	Sunday after Christmas	—	= TVWV 1:1163	Telemann Portal; Catalogue TWV
TVWV 1	TVWV 1:1165	Nun danket alle Gott	New Year	—	Lost	Telemann Portal; Catalogue TWV
TVWV 1	TVWV 1:1166	Nun danket alle Gott	Cantata for the Feast of Thanksgiving	SATB with flute, 2 bugles, timpani, 2 violins, viola, cello and continuo	—	Telemann Portal; Catalogue TWV
TVWV 1	TVWV 1:1167	Nun freut euch, Gottes Kinder	Ascension Day	Solo soprano and SATB with 2 violins, viola, cello and continuo	—	Telemann Portal; Catalogue TWV
TVWV 1	TVWV 1:1168	Nun freut euch, liebe Christeng'mein	2nd day of Easter	—	= TVWV 1:1169	Telemann Portal; Catalogue TWV
TVWV 1	TVWV 1:1169	Nun freut euch, liebe Christeng'mein	2nd day of Easter	—	= TVWV 1:1168	Telemann Portal; Catalogue TWV
TVWV 1	TVWV 1:1170	Nun ist das Heil und die Kraft	Feast of St. Michael	SATB with 2 bugles, timpani, 2 violins, viola, cello and continuo	—	Telemann Portal; Catalogue TWV
TVWV 1	TVWV 1:1171	Nun ist das Heil und die Kraft	Feast of St. Michael	SATB with 2 flutes, oboe, 2 trumpets, timpani, 2 violins, viola, cello and continuo	—	Telemann Portal; Catalogue TWV
TVWV 1	TVWV 1:1172	Nun ist das Heil und die Kraft	Feast of St. Michael	SATB with 2 flutes, 2 oboes, 2 horns, 2 trumpets, timpani, 2 violins, viola, cello and continuo	—	Telemann Portal; Catalogue TWV
TVWV 1	TVWV 1:1173	Nun ist das Reich des göttlichen Sohnes	Feast of Pentecost	SATB with flute, oboe, 2 trumpets, timpani, 2 violins, viola, cello and continuo	—	Telemann Portal; Catalogue TWV
TVWV 1	TVWV 1:1174	Nun komm, der Heiden Heiland	1st Sunday after Advent	SATB with 2 oboes, 2 bugles, timpani, 2 violins, viola, cello and continuo	—	Telemann Portal; Catalogue TWV
TVWV 1	TVWV 1:1175	Nun komm, der Heiden Heiland	1st Sunday after Advent	SATB with 2 oboes, 2 piccolo bugles, 2 violins, viola, cello and continuo	= TVWV 1:1176	Telemann Portal; Catalogue TWV
TVWV 1	TVWV 1:1176	Nun komm, der Heiden Heiland	1st Sunday after Advent	—	= TVWV 1:1175	Telemann Portal; Catalogue TWV
TVWV 1	TVWV 1:1177	Nun komm der Heiden Heiland	1st Sunday after Advent	SATB with 2 violins, viola, double bass and continuo	—	Telemann Portal; Catalogue TWV
TVWV 1	TVWV 1:1178	Nun komm, der Heiden Heiland	1st Sunday after Advent	SATB with [2 oboes], 2 violins, viola, double bass and continuo	—	Telemann Portal; Catalogue TWV
TVWV 1	TVWV 1:1179	Nun kommt die große Marterwoche	Palm Sunday	SATB with 2 oboes, 2 violins, viola, cello and continuo	—	Telemann Portal; Catalogue TWV
TVWV 1	TVWV 1:1180	Nun lass uns Gott, den Herrn	4th Sunday after Easter	—	Lost	Telemann Portal; Catalogue TWV
TVWV 1	TVWV 1:1181	Nun lernet dich mein Herze kennen	Sunday After New Year's Eve	SATB with 2 flutes/oboe, 2 violins, viola, cello and continuo	—	Telemann Portal; Catalogue TWV
TVWV 1	TVWV 1:1182	Nunmehr hab ich ausgeruft	12th Sunday after Trinity	SATB with 2 oboes, 2 violins, viola, cello and continuo	—	Telemann Portal; Catalogue TWV
TVWV 1	TVWV 1:1183	Nun weicht, ihr trüben Trauerstunden	Feast of the Assumption of Mary	SATB with 2 violins and continuo	—	Telemann Portal; Catalogue TWV
TVWV 1	TVWV 1:1184	Nun wir denn sind gerecht worden	1st Sunday after Easter	SATB with 2 oboes, 2 violins, viola, cello and continuo	—	Telemann Portal; Catalogue TWV
TVWV 1	TVWV 1:1185	Nur getrost und unverzagt	Rogation Festival	SS/TT with oboe, violin, viola, cello and continuo	—	Telemann Portal; Catalogue TWV
TVWV 1	TVWV 1:1186	Ob bei uns ist der Sünden viel	3rd Sunday after Trinity	SATB with 2 oboes, 2 violins, viola, cello and continuo	—	Telemann Portal; Catalogue TWV
TVWV 1	TVWV 1:1187	Ob Menschen klug und weise	1st Sunday after Epiphany	—	Lost	Telemann Portal; Catalogue TWV
TVWV 1	TVWV 1:1188	O ein gütiges Befehlen	15th Sunday after Trinity	SATB with 2 oboes, 2 violins, viola, cello and continuo	—	Telemann Portal; Catalogue TWV
TVWV 1	TVWV 1:1189	O Ewigkeit, o Ewigkeit, wer denkt an dich	1st Sunday after Trinity	SATB with 2 oboes, 2 violins, viola, cello and continuo	—	Telemann Portal; Catalogue TWV
TVWV 1	TVWV 1:1190	O fröhliche Stunden, der Lebensfürst lebt	Easter	Solo tenor with 2 oboes, 2 horns, 2 violins, viola, cello and continuo	—	Telemann Portal; Catalogue TWV
TVWV 1	TVWV 1:1191	O Gotteslamm, o Liebesflamm	18th Sunday after Trinity	Solo soprano and SATB with 2 violins, viola and continuo	—	Telemann Portal; Catalogue TWV
TVWV 1	TVWV 1:1192	O Gottes Sohn, Herr Jesu Christ	21st Sunday after Trinity	Bass solo and SATB with 2 violins, viola and continuo	—	Telemann Portal; Catalogue TWV
TVWV 1	TVWV 1:1193	O Gott, gedenke mein am besten	Miscellaneous cantatas	TB with 2 violins, viola, cello and continuo	—	Telemann Portal; Catalogue TWV
TVWV 1	TVWV 1:1194	O Gott, wie groß ist deine Güte	Septuagesima Sunday	SATB with 2 oboes, 2 violins, viola, cello and continuo	—	Telemann Portal; Catalogue TWV
TVWV 1	TVWV 1:1195	O große Lieb	Sunday of Quinquagesima	Solo viola and SATB with 2 violins, viola, cello and continuo	—	Telemann Portal; Catalogue TWV
TVWV 1	TVWV 1:1196	O großer Gott von Macht	10th Sunday after Trinity	SATB with 2 oboes, 2 violins, viola, cello and continuo	—	Telemann Portal; Catalogue TWV
TVWV 1	TVWV 1:1197	O heilige Zeit, o Himmel	Christmas Feast	—	Lost	Telemann Portal; Catalogue TWV
TVWV 1	TVWV 1:1198	Ohne Glauben ist's ohnmöglich	3rd Sunday after Epiphany	—	Lost	Telemann Portal; Catalogue TWV
TVWV 1	TVWV 1:1199	Ohne Glauben ist's unmöglich	1st Sunday after Easter	SAB with 2 violins, viola and continuo	—	Telemann Portal; Catalogue TWV
TVWV 1	TVWV 1:1200	O Jesu Christ, dein Krippelein ist	2nd day of the Christmas festival	Solo soprano and SATB with 2 violins, viola, cello and continuo	—	Telemann Portal; Catalogue TWV
TVWV 1	TVWV 1:1201	O Jesu, meine Wonne	20th Sunday after Trinity	Bass solo and SATB with 2 violins, viola and continuo	—	Telemann Portal; Catalogue TWV
TVWV 1	TVWV 1:1202	O Jesu, treuer Hirte	2nd Sunday after Easter	Solo soprano and SATB with 2 violins, viola, cello and continuo	—	Telemann Portal; Catalogue TWV
TVWV 1	TVWV 1:1203	O Land, höre des Herrn Wort	10th Sunday after Trinity	SATB with flute, 2 oboes, 2 violins, viola, cello and continuo	—	Telemann Portal; Catalogue TWV
TVWV 1	TVWV 1:1204	O liebster Gott, was mangelt mir	Feast of Pentecost	—	Lost	Telemann Portal; Catalogue TWV
TVWV 1	TVWV 1:1205	O mein Gott, vor den ich trete	1st Sunday after Easter	SATB with flute, 2 oboes, bassoon, 2 violins, viola, cello and continuo	—	Telemann Portal; Catalogue TWV
TVWV 1	TVWV 1:1206	O mein Gott, vor den ich trete	1st Sunday after Easter	SATB with 2 oboes, 2 violins, viola, cello and continuo	—	Telemann Portal; Catalogue TWV
TVWV 1	TVWV 1:1207	O Mensch, bedenke stets dein Ende	1st Sunday after Trinity	Solo bass and SATB with 2 violins, viola, cello and continuo	—	Telemann Portal; Catalogue TWV
TVWV 1	TVWV 1:1208	O Mensch, bedenk doch in der Zeit	10th Sunday after Trinity	—	Lost	Telemann Portal; Catalogue TWV
TVWV 1	TVWV 1:1209	O Mensch, wer du auch immer bist	9th Sunday after Trinity	Bass solo and SATB with 2 violins, viola and continuo	—	Telemann Portal; Catalogue TWV
TVWV 1	TVWV 1:1210	Opfere Gott Dank	23rd Sunday after Trinity	SATB with oboe, 2 violins, viola, cello and continuo	—	Telemann Portal; Catalogue TWV
TVWV 1	TVWV 1:1210a	Opfre Gott Preis, Lob und	22nd Sunday after Trinity	Solo voice with violin, viola and continuo	Version	Catalogue TWV
TVWV 1	TVWV 1:1210b	O schmode Wollust dieser Erden	23rd Sunday after Trinity	Solo voice with 2 violins and continuo	Version	Catalogue TWV
TVWV 1	TVWV 1:1211	O selig ist, wer Jesum schauet	13th Sunday after Trinity	—	Lost	Telemann Portal; Catalogue TWV
TVWV 1	TVWV 1:1212	O selig Vergnügen, o heilige Lust	Choral cantata for communion	AB with 2 flutes, 2 violins and continuo	—	Telemann Portal; Catalogue TWV
TVWV 1	TVWV 1:1213	O seltnes Meisterstück der Liebe	3rd day of Christmas	—	Lost	Telemann Portal; Catalogue TWV
TVWV 1	TVWV 1:1214	O setze alles Leid hintan, o Seel	Feast of Pentecost	SATB with 2 transverse flutes, oboe, 2 trumpets, timpani, 2 violins, viola, cello and continuo	—	Telemann Portal; Catalogue TWV
TVWV 1	TVWV 1:1215	O tausendmal gewünschter Tag	Feast of the Assumption of Mary	SATB with 2 violins, viola, cello and continuo	—	Telemann Portal; Catalogue TWV
TVWV 1	TVWV 1:1216	Gelobet sei der Herr, der Gott Israel	Feast of St. John the Baptist	SATB with oboe, 3 horns, 2 violins, viola, cello and continuo	= TVWV 1:602, HWV Anh. B 205	Telemann Portal; Catalogue TWV
TVWV 1	TVWV 1:1217	O wie herrlich wirds im Himmel	Feast of the Purification of Mary	SATB with 2 violins, viola, cello and continuo	= TVWV 1:1218	Telemann Portal; Catalogue TWV
TVWV 1	TVWV 1:1218	O wie herrlich wirds im Himmel	Feast of the Purification of Mary	—	= TVWV 1:1217	Telemann Portal; Catalogue TWV
TVWV 1	TVWV 1:1219	O wie ist die Barmherzigkeit des Herrn	12th Sunday after Trinity	SATB with 2 oboes, 2 violins, viola, cello and continuo	—	Telemann Portal; Catalogue TWV
TVWV 1	TVWV 1:1220	O wie selig ist die Stunde	6th Sunday after Trinity	SATB with 2 flutes, oboe, 2 violins, viola, cello and continuo	—	Telemann Portal; Catalogue TWV
TVWV 1	TVWV 1:1221	O wie wird der Mensch geliebt	Miscellaneous cantatas	SATB with 2 hunting horns, 2 violins, viola and continuo	—	Telemann Portal; Catalogue TWV
TVWV 1	TVWV 1:1222	Packe dich, gelähmter Drache	Feast of St. Michael	Solo voice with violin and continuo	—	Telemann Portal; Catalogue TWV
TVWV 1	TVWV 1:1223	Posaunen wird man hören gehn	26th Sunday after Trinity	SATB with 2 oboes, trombone, 2 violins, viola, cello and continuo	—	Telemann Portal; Catalogue TWV
TVWV 1	TVWV 1:1223a	Prang im Gold, stolze Welt	20th Sunday after Trinity	Solo voice with violin, viola, cello and continuo	Version	Catalogue TWV
TVWV 1	TVWV 1:1223b	Pragende Lilien in spross	15th Sunday after Trinity	Solo voice with violin, viola and continuo	Version	Catalogue TWV
TVWV 1	TVWV 1:1224	Preise, Jerusalem, den Herrn	New Year	—	Lost	Telemann Portal; Catalogue TWV
TVWV 1	TVWV 1:1225	Redet untereinander mit Psalmen und Lobgesängen	New Year	SATB with 2 oboes, 3 bugles, timpani, 2 violins, viola, cello and continuo	—	Telemann Portal; Catalogue TWV
TVWV 1	TVWV 1:1226	Redet untereinander mit Psalmen und Lobgesängen	Feast of the Visitation of Mary	SATB with 2 violins, viola, cello and continuo	—	Telemann Portal; Catalogue TWV
TVWV 1	TVWV 1:1227	Reichtum und alle Schätze	Miscellaneous cantatas	—	—	Telemann Portal; Catalogue TWV
TVWV 1	TVWV 1:1228	Reiner Geist, lass doch mein Herz	Feast of Pentecost	Solo bass with flute, unison violins, cello and continuo	—	Telemann Portal; Catalogue TWV
TVWV 1	TVWV 1:1229	Reiss los, reiss vom Leibe	6th Sunday after Epiphany	Solo voice with violin, viola and continuo	—	Catalogue TWV
TVWV 1	TVWV 1:1229a	Rufst du, susse Hirtenstimme	2nd Sunday after Easter	Solo voice with violin, viola and continuo	Version	Catalogue TWV
TVWV 1	TVWV 1:1230	Ruft es aus in alle Welt	Christmas Feast	SATB with 3 bugles, timpani, 2 violins, viola and continuo	—	Telemann Portal; Catalogue TWV
TVWV 1	TVWV 1:1231	Sage mir an, du, den meine Seele liebet	1st Sunday after Epiphany	—	—	Telemann Portal; Catalogue TWV
TVWV 1	TVWV 1:1232	Sag nicht, ich bin ein Christ	4th Sunday after Trinity	SATB with 2 oboes, 2 violins, viola, cello and continuo	—	Telemann Portal; Catalogue TWV
TVWV 1	TVWV 1:1233	Saget den verzagten Herzen	1st Sunday after Advent	SATB with 2 oboes, 2 violins, viola, cello and continuo	—	Telemann Portal; Catalogue TWV
TVWV 1	TVWV 1:1234	Saget der Tochter Zion: Siehe, dein Heil kommt	1st Sunday after Advent	SATB with 2 oboes, 2 violins, viola, double bass and continuo	—	Telemann Portal; Catalogue TWV
TVWV 1	TVWV 1:1235	Saget der Tochter Zion: Siehe, dein Heil kommt	1st Sunday after Advent	SATB with 2 oboes, 3 bugles, timpani, 2 violins, viola, cello and continuo	—	Telemann Portal; Catalogue TWV
TVWV 1	TVWV 1:1235a	Sanftmutswolle, zarte Triebe	22nd Sunday after Trinity	Solo voice with oboe, violin and continuo	Version	Catalogue TWV
TVWV 1	TVWV 1:1236	Sanftmut und Geduld sind die Schilder	3rd Sunday of Lent	SATB with 2 oboes, 2 violins, viola, cello and continuo	—	Telemann Portal; Catalogue TWV
TVWV 1	TVWV 1:1237	Schaffe in mir, Gott, ein reines Herz	Feast of Pentecost	—	Lost	Telemann Portal; Catalogue TWV
TVWV 1	TVWV 1:1238	Schaffe in mir, Gott, ein reines Herz	Feast of Pentecost	SATB with 2 oboes, 3 bugles, timpani, 2 violins, viola, cello and continuo	—	Telemann Portal; Catalogue TWV
TVWV 1	TVWV 1:1239	Schaffe in mir, Gott, ein reines Herz	Feast of the Purification of Mary	—	Lost	Telemann Portal; Catalogue TWV
TVWV 1	TVWV 1:1240	Schaffe in mir, Gott, ein reines Herz	Choral cantata for communion	SATB with 2 oboes, 2 violins, viola, cello and continuo	—	Telemann Portal; Catalogue TWV
TVWV 1	TVWV 1:1241	Schaffe in mir, Gott, ein reines Herz	2nd day of the feast of Pentecost	SATB with 2 violins, viola, double bass and continuo	—	Telemann Portal; Catalogue TWV
TVWV 1	TVWV 1:1241a	Schmucke dich nur, wie	8th Sunday after Trinity	Solo voice with violin, viola and continuo	Version	Catalogue TWV
TVWV 1	TVWV 1:1242	Schaue Zion, die Stadt unsers Stifts	New Year	SATB with 2 flutes, oboe, 2 trumpets, timpani, 2 violins, viola, cello and continuo	—	Telemann Portal; Catalogue TWV
TVWV 1	TVWV 1:1243	Schau nach Sodom nicht zurücke!	14th Sunday after Trinity	Solo voice with oboe and continuo	—	Telemann Portal; Catalogue TWV
TVWV 1	TVWV 1:1244	Schau, Seele! Jesus geht zum Vater	4th Sunday after Easter	SATB with 2 oboes, 2 violins, viola, cello and continuo	—	Telemann Portal; Catalogue TWV
TVWV 1	TVWV 1:1245	Schaut die Demut Palmen tragen	Palm Sunday	Solo voice with oboe and continuo	—	Telemann Portal; Catalogue TWV
TVWV 1	TVWV 1:1246	Schicket euch in die Zeit	25th Sunday after Trinity	—	Lost	Telemann Portal; Catalogue TWV
TVWV 1	TVWV 1:1247	Schicket euch in die Zeit	25th Sunday after Trinity	SATB with 2 oboes, 2 chalumeaux, 2 violins, viola, cello and continuo	—	Telemann Portal; Catalogue TWV
TVWV 1	TVWV 1:1248	Schlage, bald erwünschte Stunde	2nd Sunday after Epiphany	SATB with oboe, 2 violins, viola and continuo	—	Telemann Portal; Catalogue TWV
TVWV 1	TVWV 1:1249	Schmecket und sehet, wie freundlich der Herr ist	2nd day of the Christmas festival	—	Lost	Telemann Portal; Catalogue TWV
TVWV 1	TVWV 1:1250	Schmecket und sehet, wie freundlich der Herr ist	7th Sunday after Trinity	SAB with 2 violins, viola and continuo	—	Telemann Portal; Catalogue TWV
TVWV 1	TVWV 1:1251	Schmecket und sehet, wie freundlich der Herr ist	Christmas Feast	SSATTBBB with 2 transverse flutes, 2 piccolo flutes, 2 oboes, 3 trumpets, timpani, 2 violins, viola and continuo	—	Telemann Portal; Catalogue TWV
TVWV 1	TVWV 1:1252	Schmeckt und sehet unsers Gottes Freundlichkeit	Sunday After New Year's Eve	Solo voice with oboe and continuo	—	Telemann Portal; Catalogue TWV
TVWV 1	TVWV 1:1253	Schmücke dich, o liebe Seele	22nd Sunday after Trinity	SATB with 2 oboes, 2 violins, viola, cello and continuo	—	Telemann Portal; Catalogue TWV
TVWV 1	TVWV 1:1254	Schmücke dich, o liebe Seele	Miscellaneous cantatas	SATB with oboe, 2 violins, viola, cello and continuo	—	Telemann Portal; Catalogue TWV
TVWV 1	TVWV 1:1255	Schmücket das Fest mit Maien	Feast of Pentecost	SATB with flute, 2 oboes, 3 bugles, timpani, 2 violins, viola, cello and continuo	—	Telemann Portal; Catalogue TWV
TVWV 1	TVWV 1:1256	Schmückt das frohe Fest mit Maien	2nd day of the feast of Pentecost	Solo voice with violin and continuo	—	Telemann Portal; Catalogue TWV
TVWV 1	TVWV 1:1257	Schwing dich auf zu deinem Gott	4th Sunday after Easter	SATB with 2 oboes, 2 violins, viola, cello and continuo	—	Telemann Portal; Catalogue TWV
TVWV 1	TVWV 1:1258	Seele, lerne dich erkennen!	Sunday of Quinquagesima	Solo voice with recorder and continuo	—	Telemann Portal; Catalogue TWV
TVWV 1	TVWV 1:1258a	Seel und Leib sind fest	13th Sunday after Trinity	Solo voice with violin, viola and continuo	Version	Catalogue TWV
TVWV 1	TVWV 1:1258b	Segenereicher Gang	4th Sunday after Easter	Solo voice with violin, viola and continuo	Version	Catalogue TWV
TVWV 1	TVWV 1:1259	Sehet an die Exempel der Alten	2nd Sunday after Epiphany	SATB with 2 oboes, horn, 3 trumpets, 2 violins, viola, cello and continuo	—	Telemann Portal; Catalogue TWV
TVWV 1	TVWV 1:1260	Sehet auf und hebet eure Häupter	2nd Sunday of Advent	SATB with 2 oboes, 2 violins, viola, double bass and continuo	—	Telemann Portal; Catalogue TWV
TVWV 1	TVWV 1:1261	Sehet darauf, dass nicht jemand	10th Sunday after Trinity	—	Lost	Telemann Portal; Catalogue TWV
TVWV 1	TVWV 1:1262	Sehet nun zu, wie ihr fürsichtiglich wandelt	8th Sunday after Trinity	SATB with 2 oboes, 2 violins, viola, double bass and continuo	—	Telemann Portal; Catalogue TWV
TVWV 1	TVWV 1:1263	Sehet, wir gehn hinauf nach Jerusalem	Sunday of Quinquagesima	SATB with oboe, 2 violins, viola, cello and continuo	—	Telemann Portal; Catalogue TWV
TVWV 1	TVWV 1:1264	Seht, wir gehn hinauf nach Jerusalem	Sunday of Quinquagesima	SATB with 2 oboes, 2 violins, viola, cello and continuo	—	Telemann Portal; Catalogue TWV
TVWV 1	TVWV 1:1265	Sehet, wir gehn hinauf nach Jerusalem	Sunday of Quinquagesima	SATB with 2 violins, viola, double bass and continuo	—	Telemann Portal; Catalogue TWV
TVWV 1	TVWV 1:1266	Seid allesamt gleichgesinnt	6th Sunday after Trinity	SATB with 2 oboes, 2 violins, viola, cello and continuo	—	Telemann Portal; Catalogue TWV
TVWV 1	TVWV 1:1267	Seid allezeit bereit zur Verantwortung	4th Sunday of Advent	SATB with 2 oboes, 2 violins, viola, cello and continuo	—	Telemann Portal; Catalogue TWV
TVWV 1	TVWV 1:1268	Seid barmherzig wie auch eure Väter	4th Sunday after Trinity	SATB with 4 oboes, 2 violins, viola, cello and continuo	—	Telemann Portal; Catalogue TWV
TVWV 1	TVWV 1:1269	Seid dankbar in allen Dingen	14th Sunday after Trinity	SAB with 2 violins, viola and continuo	—	Telemann Portal; Catalogue TWV
TVWV 1	TVWV 1:1270	Seid getrost, fürchtet euch nicht	3rd Sunday of Lent	SATB with 2 oboes, 2 violins, viola, cello and continuo	—	Telemann Portal; Catalogue TWV
TVWV 1	TVWV 1:1271	Seid getrost und hoch erfreut	26th Sunday after Trinity	Solo bass and SATB with 2 violins, viola, cello and continuo	—	Telemann Portal; Catalogue TWV
TVWV 1	TVWV 1:1272	Seid ihr mit Christo auferstanden	Ascension Day	SATB with 2 oboes, 3 bugles, timpani, 2 violins, viola, cello and continuo	—	Telemann Portal; Catalogue TWV
TVWV 1	TVWV 1:1273	Seid nüchtern und wachet	5th Sunday after Epiphany	SATB with 2 oboes, viola, cello and continuo	—	Telemann Portal; Catalogue TWV
TVWV 1	TVWV 1:1274	Seid nüchtern und wachet	1st Sunday of Lent	SATB with 2 flutes, 2 oboes, 2 hunting horns, 2 violins, viola, cello and continuo	—	Telemann Portal; Catalogue TWV
TVWV 1	TVWV 1:1275	Seid nüchtern und wachet	5th Sunday after Epiphany	SATB with 2 oboes, 2 violins, viola, double bass and continuo	—	Telemann Portal; Catalogue TWV
TVWV 1	TVWV 1:1276	Seid nüchtern und wachet	1st Sunday after Easter	SATB with 2 oboes, 2 violins, viola, double bass and continuo	—	Telemann Portal; Catalogue TWV
TVWV 1	TVWV 1:1277	Seid nüchtern und wachet	5th Sunday after Epiphany	—	Lost	Telemann Portal; Catalogue TWV
TVWV 1	TVWV 1:1278	Seid nüchtern und wachet	1st Sunday of Lent	SAB with 2 violins, viola and continuo	—	Telemann Portal; Catalogue TWV
TVWV 1	TVWV 1:1279	Seid stark in dem Herrn	1st Sunday of Lent	SATB with 2 oboes, 2 violins, viola, cello and continuo	—	Telemann Portal; Catalogue TWV
TVWV 1	TVWV 1:1280	Seid stark in dem Herrn	Sunday of Quinquagesima	SATB with 2 oboes, 2 violins, viola, cello and continuo	—	Telemann Portal; Catalogue TWV
TVWV 1	TVWV 1:1281	Seid wacker allezeit und betet	2nd Sunday of Advent	SATB with 2 oboes, 2 violins, viola, cello and continuo	—	Telemann Portal; Catalogue TWV
TVWV 1	TVWV 1:1282	Sei du mein Anfang	1st Sunday after Advent	SATB with flute, oboe, 2 violins, viola, cello and continuo	—	Telemann Portal; Catalogue TWV
TVWV 1	TVWV 1:1283	Sei getreu bis in den Tod	3rd Sunday of Advent	SATB with 2 oboes, 2 bassoons, 2 violins, viola, cello and continuo	—	Telemann Portal; Catalogue TWV
TVWV 1	TVWV 1:1284	Sei getreu bis in den Tod	Sunday after Ascension Day	SATB with 2 violins, viola, cello and continuo	—	Telemann Portal; Catalogue TWV
TVWV 1	TVWV 1:1285	Sei getrost in deinem Leiden	19th Sunday after Trinity	—	Lost	Telemann Portal; Catalogue TWV
TVWV 1	TVWV 1:1286	Sei, Herr Jesu, sei gepreist	4th Sunday after Easter	—	Lost	Telemann Portal; Catalogue TWV
TVWV 1	TVWV 1:1287	Sei Jesu treu bis in den Tod	3rd Sunday of Advent	SATB with 2 oboes, 2 violins, viola, cello and continuo	—	Telemann Portal; Catalogue TWV
TVWV 1	TVWV 1:1288	Sein starker Arm hat mit dem Tode gerungen	2nd day of Easter	SATB with 3 bugles, 2 violins, viola, cello and continuo	—	Telemann Portal; Catalogue TWV
TVWV 1	TVWV 1:1288a	Sei still, zerreiss der Nahrung Netze	5th Sunday after Trinity	Solo voice with 2 violins and continuo	Version	Catalogue TWV
TVWV 1	TVWV 1:1289	Sei unverzagt, tu recht und traue	23rd Sunday after Trinity	—	Lost	Telemann Portal; Catalogue TWV
TVWV 1	TVWV 1:1290	Sei zufrieden, meine Seele	2nd day of Easter	Bass solo with violin and continuo	—	Telemann Portal; Catalogue TWV
TVWV 1	TVWV 1:1291	Selig ist der Mann, der die Anfechtung erduldet	Sunday after Ascension Day	SATB with 2 oboes, 2 violins, viola, cello and continuo	—	Telemann Portal; Catalogue TWV
TVWV 1	TVWV 1:1292	Selig ist der Mann, der die Anfechtung erduldet	2nd day of the Christmas festival	SATB with 2 violins, 2 violas, double bass and continuo	—	Telemann Portal; Catalogue TWV
TVWV 1	TVWV 1:1293	Selig ist der und heilig	24th Sunday after Trinity	SATB with 2 oboes, 2 violins, viola, cello and continuo	—	Telemann Portal; Catalogue TWV
TVWV 1	TVWV 1:1294	Selig sind die Augen	13th Sunday after Trinity	SATB with 2 oboes, 2 violins, viola, cello and continuo	—	Telemann Portal; Catalogue TWV
TVWV 1	TVWV 1:1295	Selig sind, die Gottes Wort hören	Sunday of Sexagesima	SATB with 2 oboes, 2 violins, viola, cello and continuo	—	Telemann Portal; Catalogue TWV
TVWV 1	TVWV 1:1296	Selig sind, die Gottes Wort hören	Sunday of Sexagesima	SATB with 2 oboes, 2 violins, viola, cello and continuo	—	Telemann Portal; Catalogue TWV
TVWV 1	TVWV 1:1297	Selig sind, die Gottes Wort hören	3rd Sunday of Lent	—	—	Telemann Portal; Catalogue TWV
TVWV 1	TVWV 1:1298	Selig sind die Toten	24th Sunday after Trinity	SATB with 2 oboes, 2 violins, viola, double bass and continuo	—	Telemann Portal; Catalogue TWV
TVWV 1	TVWV 1:1299	Selig sind die Toten	24th Sunday after Trinity	SATB with 2 oboes, 2 bassoons, 2 violins, viola, cello and continuo	—	Telemann Portal; Catalogue TWV
TVWV 1	TVWV 1:1300	Selig sind die Toten	16th Sunday after Trinity	SATB with 2 oboes, 2 violins, viola, cello and continuo	—	Telemann Portal; Catalogue TWV
TVWV 1	TVWV 1:1301	Selig sind die Toten	16th Sunday after Trinity	—	Lost	Telemann Portal; Catalogue TWV
TVWV 1	TVWV 1:1302	Selig sind die Toten	15th Sunday after Trinity	SATB with oboe d'amore, bassoon, 2 violins, viola, cello and continuo	—	Telemann Portal; Catalogue TWV
TVWV 1	TVWV 1:1303	Selig sind die Toten	Feast of the Purification of Mary	SATB with 2 violins, viola, cello and continuo	—	Telemann Portal; Catalogue TWV
TVWV 1	TVWV 1:1304	Selig sind, die zum Abendmahl des Lammes berufen sind	2nd Sunday after Trinity	ATB with 2 flutes, 2 violins, viola, double bass and continuo	—	Telemann Portal; Catalogue TWV
TVWV 1	TVWV 1:1305	Selig sind, die zum Abendmahl des Lammes berufen sind	20th Sunday after Trinity	SATB with 3 bugles, timpani, 2 violins, viola, cello and continuo	—	Telemann Portal; Catalogue TWV
TVWV 1	TVWV 1:1306	Selig sind, die zum Abendmahl des Lammes berufen sind	2nd Sunday after Trinity	SATB with 2 flutes, 2 oboes, 2 violins, viola, cello and continuo	—	Telemann Portal; Catalogue TWV
TVWV 1	TVWV 1:1307	Selig sind, die zum Abendmahl des Lammes berufen sind	2nd Sunday after Trinity	SATB with 2 trumpets, timpani, 2 violins, viola, cello and continuo	—	Telemann Portal; Catalogue TWV
TVWV 1	TVWV 1:1308	Selig sind, die zum Abendmahl	2nd Sunday after Trinity	SAB with 2 violins, viola and continuo	—	Telemann Portal; Catalogue TWV
TVWV 1	TVWV 1:1309	Selig sind, die zum Abendmahl des Lammes berufen sind	2nd Sunday after Trinity	SATB with 2 oboes, 2 violins, 2 violas, cello and continuo	—	Telemann Portal; Catalogue TWV
TVWV 1	TVWV 1:1310	Sende dein Licht	Feast of St. Michael	—	Lost	Telemann Portal; Catalogue TWV
TVWV 1	TVWV 1:1311	Sie gehen dahin unter den Sorgen	2nd day of the Christmas festival	SATTB with oboe, 2 violins, viola and continuo	—	Telemann Portal; Catalogue TWV
TVWV 1	TVWV 1:1312	Sie gehen in die Welt	24th Sunday after Trinity	SATB with oboe, horn, 2 violins, viola, cello and continuo	—	Telemann Portal; Catalogue TWV
TVWV 1	TVWV 1:1313	Siehe an meinen Jammer und Elend	14th Sunday after Trinity	SATB with 2 oboes, 2 violins, viola, cello and continuo	—	Telemann Portal; Catalogue TWV
TVWV 1	TVWV 1:1314	Siehe da, eine Hütte Gottes	Feast of Pentecost	SATB with 2 oboes, 2 violins, viola, cello and continuo	—	Telemann Portal; Catalogue TWV
TVWV 1	TVWV 1:1315	Siehe da, ich lege in Zion einen Stein	Sunday after Christmas	SATB with 2 oboes, 2 violins, viola, cello and continuo	—	Telemann Portal; Catalogue TWV
TVWV 1	TVWV 1:1316	Siehe, das ist Gottes Lamm	Sunday of Quinquagesima	SATB with 2 oboes, 2 violins, viola, cello and continuo	—	Telemann Portal; Catalogue TWV
TVWV 1	TVWV 1:1317	Siehe, das ist Gottes Lamm	Sunday of Quinquagesima	SATB with 2 oboes, 2 violins, viola, cello and continuo	= TVWV 1:1319	Telemann Portal; Catalogue TWV
TVWV 1	TVWV 1:1318	Siehe, das ist Gottes Lamm	Sunday of Quinquagesima	SAB with 2 violins, viola and continuo	—	Telemann Portal; Catalogue TWV
TVWV 1	TVWV 1:1319	Siehe, das ist Gottes Lamm	3rd Sunday after Trinity	—	= TVWV 1:1317	Telemann Portal; Catalogue TWV
TVWV 1	TVWV 1:1320	Siehe, das ist Gottes Lamm	Palm Sunday	SATB with 3 oboes, 2 violins, viola, cello and continuo	—	Telemann Portal; Catalogue TWV
TVWV 1	TVWV 1:1321	Siehe, dein Heil kommt	1st Sunday after Advent	SATB with 3 trumpets, 2 violins, viola, cello and continuo	—	Telemann Portal; Catalogue TWV
TVWV 1	TVWV 1:1322	Siehe, der Herr kommt	2nd Sunday of Advent	SATB with 2 oboes, 2 violins, viola, cello and continuo	—	Telemann Portal; Catalogue TWV
TVWV 1	TVWV 1:1323	Siehe, der Hüter Israel	2nd day of the Christmas festival	—	Lost	Telemann Portal; Catalogue TWV
TVWV 1	TVWV 1:1324	Siehe, des Herren Auge siehet auf die, so ihn fürchten	7th Sunday after Trinity	SATB with 2 oboes, 2 violins, viola, cello and continuo	—	Telemann Portal; Catalogue TWV
TVWV 1	TVWV 1:1325	Siehe, dieser wird gesetzt zu einem Fall	Sunday after Christmas	SATB with 2 violins, viola and continuo	—	Telemann Portal; Catalogue TWV
TVWV 1	TVWV 1:1326	Siehe, eine Jungfrau ist schwanger	Feast of the Assumption of Mary	SATB with 2 oboes, 2 bassoons, 2 violins, viola, cello and continuo	—	Telemann Portal; Catalogue TWV
TVWV 1	TVWV 1:1327	Siehe, eine Jungfrau ist schwanger	New Year	SATB with 2 oboes, 2 violins, viola, cello and continuo	—	Telemann Portal; Catalogue TWV
TVWV 1	TVWV 1:1328	Siehe, es hat überwunden der Löwe	3rd day of Easter	—	= BWV 219, BWV Anh. III 157	Telemann Portal; Catalogue TWV
TVWV 1	TVWV 1:1329	Siehe, es hat überwunden der Löwe	Easter	SATB with 2 oboes, 3 bugles, timpani, 2 violins, viola, double bass and continuo	—	Telemann Portal; Catalogue TWV
TVWV 1	TVWV 1:1330	Siehe, es kömmt ein Tag, der brennen soll	26th Sunday after Trinity	SATB with 2 violins, viola, cello and continuo	—	Telemann Portal; Catalogue TWV
TVWV 1	TVWV 1:1331	Siehe, ich komme, im Buch ist von mir geschrieben	Sunday of Quinquagesima	SATB with 2 violins, cello and continuo	—	Telemann Portal; Catalogue TWV
TVWV 1	TVWV 1:1332	Siehe, ich komme, im Buch ist von mir geschrieben	Sunday of Quinquagesima	SATB with 2 violins, 2 violas, cello and continuo	—	Telemann Portal; Catalogue TWV
TVWV 1	TVWV 1:1333	Siehe, ich verkündige euch große Freude	Christmas Feast	SATB with flute, oboe, 2 trumpets, timpani, 2 violins, viola, cello and continuo	—	Telemann Portal; Catalogue TWV
TVWV 1	TVWV 1:1334	Siehe, ich verkündige euch große Freude	Christmas Feast	SATB with 2 flutes, 2 oboes, 2 trumpets, timpani, 2 violins, viola, cello and continuo	—	Telemann Portal; Catalogue TWV
TVWV 1	TVWV 1:1335	Siehe, ich will meinen Engel	Feast of St. John the Baptist	—	Lost	Telemann Portal; Catalogue TWV
TVWV 1	TVWV 1:1336	Sie ist gefallen, Babylon die Große	3rd Sunday of Lent	SATB with 2 oboes, 2 violins, viola, cello and continuo	—	Telemann Portal; Catalogue TWV
TVWV 1	TVWV 1:1337	Sie ist gefallen, Babylon, die Große	3rd Sunday of Lent	SATB with 2 oboes, 2 violins, viola, cello and continuo	—	Telemann Portal; Catalogue TWV
TVWV 1	TVWV 1:1338	Sie sind allzumal Sünder	Septuagesima Sunday	—	Lost	Telemann Portal; Catalogue TWV
TVWV 1	TVWV 1:1339	Sie verachten das Gesetz des Herrn Zebaoth	10th Sunday after Trinity	SAB with 2 violins, viola and continuo	—	Telemann Portal; Catalogue TWV
TVWV 1	TVWV 1:1340	Sind sie nicht allzumal dienstbare Geister	Feast of St. Michael	SATB with 2 violins, viola, cello and continuo	—	Telemann Portal; Catalogue TWV
TVWV 1	TVWV 1:1341	Sing Dank und Ehre	Feast of St. Michael	SATB with 2 transverse flutes, oboe, 2 trumpets, timpani, 2 violins, viola, cello and continuo	—	Telemann Portal; Catalogue TWV
TVWV 1	TVWV 1:1342	Singet dem Herrn ein neues Lied	23rd Sunday after Trinity	—	Lost	Telemann Portal; Catalogue TWV
TVWV 1	TVWV 1:1343	Singet dem Herrn ein neues Lied	Ascension Day	SATB with 2 oboes, 2 trumpets, timpani, 2 violins, viola, cello and continuo	—	Telemann Portal; Catalogue TWV
TVWV 1	TVWV 1:1344	Singet dem Herrn ein neues Lied	Easter	SATB,SATB with 2 flutes, 2 oboes, 2 trumpets, timpani, 2 violins, viola, cello and continuo	—	Telemann Portal; Catalogue TWV
TVWV 1	TVWV 1:1345	Singet dem Herrn ein neues Lied	Feast of St. John the Baptist	SATB with 2 hunting horns, trumpet, 2 violins, viola, double bass, harp and continuo	—	Telemann Portal; Catalogue TWV
TVWV 1	TVWV 1:1346	Singet Gott, lobsinget seinem Namen	Feast of Pentecost	SATB with 2 oboes, 3 trombones, timpani, 2 violins, viola, cello and continuo	—	Telemann Portal; Catalogue TWV
TVWV 1	TVWV 1:1347	Singet umeinander dem Herrn	New Year	SATB,SATB with 2 flutes, 2 oboes, 2 trumpets, timpani, 2 violins, viola, cello and continuo	—	Telemann Portal; Catalogue TWV
TVWV 1	TVWV 1:1348	So der Geist des, der Jesum von den Toten	24th Sunday after Trinity	SATB with 2 oboes, 2 violins, viola, cello and continuo	—	Telemann Portal; Catalogue TWV
TVWV 1	TVWV 1:1349	So du freiest, sündigest du nicht	2nd Sunday after Epiphany	—	—	Telemann Portal; Catalogue TWV
TVWV 1	TVWV 1:1350	So du mit deinem Munde bekennest	Easter	SATB with 2 oboes, 3 bugles, timpani, bells, 2 violins, viola, cello and continuo	= BWV 145/b, BWV Anh. 157	Telemann Portal; Catalogue TWV
TVWV 1	TVWV 1:1351	So du mit deinem Munde bekennest Jesum	1st Sunday after Easter	SATB with 2 oboes, 2 violins, viola, cello, double bass and continuo	—	Telemann Portal; Catalogue TWV
TVWV 1	TVWV 1:1352	So du mit deinem Munde bekennest	1st Sunday after Easter	SATB with 2 violins, viola, double bass and continuo	—	Telemann Portal; Catalogue TWV
TVWV 1	TVWV 1:1353	So einer für alle gestorben	3rd day of Easter	—	Lost	Telemann Portal; Catalogue TWV
TVWV 1	TVWV 1:1354	So fahre hin, du tolle Schar	14th Sunday after Trinity	Solo bass and SATB with 2 violins, viola, cello and continuo	—	Telemann Portal; Catalogue TWV
TVWV 1	TVWV 1:1355	So feiern wir das hohe Fest	Easter	—	Lost	Telemann Portal; Catalogue TWV
TVWV 1	TVWV 1:1356	So Feuer als Flamme	6th Sunday after Trinity	SATB with 2 oboes, 2 violins, viola, cello and continuo	—	Telemann Portal; Catalogue TWV
TVWV 1	TVWV 1:1357	So folgt der Fesseln schütternd Klingen	3rd Sunday of Advent	SATTBBB with oboe, 2 violins, viola and continuo	—	Telemann Portal; Catalogue TWV
TVWV 1	TVWV 1:1357a	So grauss machtig ist der Teufel	3rd Sunday of Lent	Solo voice with violin, viola and continuo	Version	Catalogue TWV
TVWV 1	TVWV 1:1358	So hoch hat Gott geliebt	2nd day of the feast of Pentecost	SATB with 2 violins, viola and continuo	—	Telemann Portal; Catalogue TWV
TVWV 1	TVWV 1:1358a	So kommt dens auch	1st Sunday after Advent	Solo voice with violin, viola and continuo	Version	Catalogue TWV
TVWV 1	TVWV 1:1359	So ihr den Menschen ihre Fehler vergebet	22nd Sunday after Trinity	SATB with 2 oboes, 3 trumpets, timpani, 2 violins, viola, cello and continuo	—	Telemann Portal; Catalogue TWV
TVWV 1	TVWV 1:1360	So ihr die Person ansehet	23rd Sunday after Trinity	—	Lost	Telemann Portal; Catalogue TWV
TVWV 1	TVWV 1:1361	So ist der Mensch gesinnt	4th Sunday after Epiphany	SATB with 2 oboes, 2 violins, viola, cello and continuo	—	Telemann Portal; Catalogue TWV
TVWV 1	TVWV 1:1362	So jemand Christi Wort wird halten	Passion Sunday	SATB with 2 oboes, 2 violins, viola, cello and continuo	—	Telemann Portal; Catalogue TWV
TVWV 1	TVWV 1:1363	So lasset uns nun hinzutreten mit Freudigkeit	Rogation Festival	SATTBB with 2 violins, viola and continuo	—	Telemann Portal; Catalogue TWV
TVWV 1	TVWV 1:1364	So lasset uns nun nicht schlafen	5th Sunday after Epiphany	SAB with 2 violins, viola and continuo	—	Telemann Portal; Catalogue TWV
TVWV 1	TVWV 1:1365	Solche Lieb ist nicht zu finden	17th Sunday after Trinity	—	Lost	Telemann Portal; Catalogue TWV
TVWV 1	TVWV 1:1366	So leget ab alle Unsauberkeit	Sunday of Sexagesima	SATB with 2 flutes, 2 oboes, 2 violins, viola, cello and continuo	—	Telemann Portal; Catalogue TWV
TVWV 1	TVWV 1:1367	So leget nun ab von euch	20th Sunday after Trinity	SATB with 2 oboes, 2 violins, viola, cello, double bass and continuo	—	Telemann Portal; Catalogue TWV
TVWV 1	TVWV 1:1368	So leget nun von euch ab	New Year	SATB with 2 oboes, 3 bugles, timpani, 2 violins, viola, cello and continuo	—	Telemann Portal; Catalogue TWV
TVWV 1	TVWV 1:1369	So leget nun von euch ab	Feast of the Trinity	SATB with 2 oboes, 2 violins, viola, cello and continuo	—	Telemann Portal; Catalogue TWV
TVWV 1	TVWV 1:1370	So leget nun von euch ab	Feast of the Trinity	SATB with 2 oboes, 2 violins, viola, cello and continuo	—	Telemann Portal; Catalogue TWV
TVWV 1	TVWV 1:1371	Soll ich nicht von Jammer sagen	19th Sunday after Trinity	Solo bass with flute, 2 violins, viola, cello and continuo	—	Telemann Portal; Catalogue TWV
TVWV 1	TVWV 1:1372	Sollte ich mich nicht beklagen	1st Sunday after Epiphany	—	Lost	Telemann Portal; Catalogue TWV
TVWV 1	TVWV 1:1373	Sollt ein christliches Gemüte	Feast of St. Michael	Solo bass with flute, violins and oboes in unison, viola, cello and continuo	—	Telemann Portal; Catalogue TWV
TVWV 1	TVWV 1:1374	Sollt uns Gott nun können lassen	2nd day of the feast of Pentecost	SATB with 2 oboes, 2 violins, cello and continuo	—	Telemann Portal; Catalogue TWV
TVWV 1	TVWV 1:1375	So machts die Welt, die falsche Welt	23rd Sunday after Trinity	Solo soprano with violin, double bass and continuo	—	Telemann Portal; Catalogue TWV
TVWV 1	TVWV 1:1376	So nun das alles soll zergehen	2nd Sunday of Advent	SATB with 2 oboes, 2 violins, viola, cello and continuo	—	Telemann Portal; Catalogue TWV
TVWV 1	TVWV 1:1377	So ofte Jesu großer Name	19th Sunday after Trinity	—	Lost	Telemann Portal; Catalogue TWV
TVWV 1	TVWV 1:1378	Sorge nur nichts	2nd Sunday after Epiphany	—	Lost	Telemann Portal; Catalogue TWV
TVWV 1	TVWV 1:1379	So richtet denn des Herren Wege	4th Sunday of Advent	SATB with 2 oboes, 2 violins, 2 violas and continuo	—	Telemann Portal; Catalogue TWV
TVWV 1	TVWV 1:1380	So seid nun wacker allezeit	26th Sunday after Trinity	—	Lost	Telemann Portal; Catalogue TWV
TVWV 1	TVWV 1:1381	So seid nun wacker allezeit	27th Sunday after Trinity	—	Lost	Telemann Portal; Catalogue TWV
TVWV 1	TVWV 1:1382	So sei nun wiederum zufrieden	Feast of the Visitation of Mary	—	Lost	Telemann Portal; Catalogue TWV
TVWV 1	TVWV 1:1383	So spricht der Herr: Man höret eine klägliche Stimme	Sunday After New Year's Eve	SATB with 2 oboes, 2 violins, viola, cello and continuo	—	Telemann Portal; Catalogue TWV
TVWV 1	TVWV 1:1384	So spricht der Herr Zebaoth: Richte recht	4th Sunday after Trinity	SATB with 2 oboes, 2 violins, viola, cello and continuo	—	Telemann Portal; Catalogue TWV
TVWV 1	TVWV 1:1385	So töricht ist die Welt	3rd Sunday after Easter	SATB with 2 flutes, 2 oboes, 2 violins, viola, cello and continuo	—	Telemann Portal; Catalogue TWV
TVWV 1	TVWV 1:1386	So wie das alte Jahr mit Tagen	New Year	SATB with 3 trumpets, timpani, 2 violins, viola, cello and continuo	—	Telemann Portal; Catalogue TWV
TVWV 1	TVWV 1:1387	So wir denn nun haben, lieben Brüder	4th Sunday after Easter	SAB with 2 violins, viola and continuo	—	Telemann Portal; Catalogue TWV
TVWV 1	TVWV 1:1388	So wir sagen, dass wir Gemeinschaft mit Gott haben	11th Sunday after Trinity	SATB with 2 oboes, 2 violins, viola, cello and continuo	—	Telemann Portal; Catalogue TWV
TVWV 1	TVWV 1:1389	So wir sagen, wir haben keine Sünde	11th Sunday after Trinity	—	—	Telemann Portal; Catalogue TWV
TVWV 1	TVWV 1:1390	So ziehet nun an als die Auserwählten Gottes	6th Sunday after Trinity	SATB with 2 flutes/oboe, 2 violins, viola, double bass and continuo	—	Telemann Portal; Catalogue TWV
TVWV 1	TVWV 1:1391	So ziehet nun an als die Auserwählten Gottes	4th Sunday after Trinity	—	—	Telemann Portal; Catalogue TWV
TVWV 1	TVWV 1:1392	Sprich nicht im Mangel	4th Sunday of Lent	Solo viola and SATB with 2 violins, viola, cello and continuo	—	Telemann Portal; Catalogue TWV
TVWV 1	TVWV 1:1393	Sprich nur ein Wort, so werd ich leben	21st Sunday after Trinity	Solo soprano and SATB with 2 violins, viola, cello and continuo	—	Telemann Portal; Catalogue TWV
TVWV 1	TVWV 1:1394	Spricht der Herr aber also	3rd Sunday after Epiphany	SATB with 2 oboes, 2 violins, viola, cello and continuo	—	Telemann Portal; Catalogue TWV
TVWV 1	TVWV 1:1395	Erdulde die Dornen der plagenden Zeiten	3rd Sunday of Advent	—	= TVWV 1:446	Telemann Portal; Catalogue TWV
TVWV 1	TVWV 1:1396	Stehe auf, Nordwind, und komme, Südwind	Feast of Pentecost	—	Lost	Telemann Portal; Catalogue TWV
TVWV 1	TVWV 1:1397	Stehe auf, Nordwind, und komm, Südwind	2nd day of the feast of Pentecost	SATB with 2 recorders, 2 violins, viola, cello and continuo	—	Telemann Portal; Catalogue TWV
TVWV 1	TVWV 1:1398	Stern aus Jacob, Licht der Heiden	Feast of the Epiphany	SATB with 2 bugles, 2 violins, viola, cello and continuo	—	Telemann Portal; Catalogue TWV
TVWV 1	TVWV 1:1399	Stern aus Jacob, Licht der Welt	Sunday After New Year's Eve	—	Lost	Telemann Portal; Catalogue TWV
TVWV 1	TVWV 1:1400	Sticht dich so mancher falscher Feind	23rd Sunday after Trinity	SATB with 2 violins, viola, double bass and continuo	—	Telemann Portal; Catalogue TWV
TVWV 1	TVWV 1:1401	Stille die Tränen des winselnden Armen	2nd Sunday after Trinity	Solo voice with flute and continuo	—	Telemann Portal; Catalogue TWV
TVWV 1	TVWV 1:1402	Stimmt an mit vollen Chören	Feast of St. John the Baptist	—	Lost	Telemann Portal; Catalogue TWV
TVWV 1	TVWV 1:1403	Suchet den Herrn, weil er zu finden ist	3rd Sunday after Trinity	SATB with 2 oboes, 2 violins, viola, cello and continuo	—	Telemann Portal; Catalogue TWV
TVWV 1	TVWV 1:1404	Suchet den Herrn, weil er zu finden ist	3rd Sunday after Trinity	SATB with oboe, 2 violins, viola, cello and continuo	—	Telemann Portal; Catalogue TWV
TVWV 1	TVWV 1:1405	Suchet den Herrn, weil er zu finden ist	11th Sunday after Trinity	SAB with 2 violins, viola and continuo	—	Telemann Portal; Catalogue TWV
TVWV 1	TVWV 1:1406	Suchet den Herrn, rufet ihn an	11th Sunday after Trinity	SAB with 2 violins, viola and continuo	Version	Telemann Portal; Catalogue TWV
TVWV 1	TVWV 1:1406a	Sunder, die sich selbst	3rd Sunday of Lent	Solo voice with violin, viola and continuo	Version	Catalogue TWV
TVWV 1	TVWV 1:1407	Süßer Trost für meine kranke Seele	14th Sunday after Trinity	SATB with 2 oboes, 2 violins, viola, cello and continuo	—	Telemann Portal; Catalogue TWV
TVWV 1	TVWV 1:1408	Süsse Ruh in herben Leide	14th Sunday after Trinity	—	—	Catalogue TWV
TVWV 1	TVWV 1:1408a	Tag und Stunden sind zu	4th Sunday of Lent	Solo voice with violin, viola and continuo	Version	Catalogue TWV
TVWV 1	TVWV 1:1409	Tausend Segens Proben	Feast of the Visitation of Mary	SATB with 2 oboes, 2 violins, viola, double bass and continuo	—	Telemann Portal; Catalogue TWV
TVWV 1	TVWV 1:1409a	Todesangst und Hollenschrecken	19th Sunday after Trinity	Solo voice with violin, viola and continuo	Version	Catalogue TWV
TVWV 1	TVWV 1:1410	Tönet die Freude, belebte Trompeten	Christmas Feast	SATB with 2 flutes, 2 trumpets, timpani, 2 violins, viola, cello and continuo	—	Telemann Portal; Catalogue TWV
TVWV 1	TVWV 1:1411	Trachtet am ersten nach dem Reich Gottes	Septuagesima Sunday	SATB with 2 oboes, 2 violins, viola, cello and continuo	—	Telemann Portal; Catalogue TWV
TVWV 1	TVWV 1:1412	Trachtet am ersten nach dem Reich Gottes	15th Sunday after Trinity	SAB with 2 violins, viola and continuo	—	Telemann Portal; Catalogue TWV
TVWV 1	TVWV 1:1413	Trag mit Geduld die herben Schmerzen	Miscellaneous cantatas	TB with violin and continuo	—	Telemann Portal; Catalogue TWV
TVWV 1	TVWV 1:1414	Trauert, ihr Himmel	Easter	SATB with 2 flutes, 2 oboes, 2 trumpets, timpani, 2 violins, viola, cello and continuo	—	Telemann Portal; Catalogue TWV
TVWV 1	TVWV 1:1415	Traurig's Herz, verzage nicht	Feast of St. Michael	SATB with 2 oboes, 2 violins, viola and continuo	—	Telemann Portal; Catalogue TWV
TVWV 1	TVWV 1:1416	Treuer Gott, ich muss dir klagen	1st Sunday of Lent	SATB with 2 oboes, 2 violins, viola, cello and continuo	See TVWV 1:900	Catalogue TWV
TVWV 1	TVWV 1:1417	Trifft menschlich und voll Fehler sein	15th Sunday after Trinity	Solo voice with recorder and continuo	—	Telemann Portal; Catalogue TWV
TVWV 1	TVWV 1:1418	Tritt Arbeit und Beruf in Gottes Namen an	Septuagesima Sunday	SATB with 2 oboes, 2 hunting horns, 2 violins, viola, cello, double bass and continuo	—	Telemann Portal; Catalogue TWV
TVWV 1	TVWV 1:1419	Tritt Arbeit und Beruf in Gottes Namen an	5th Sunday after Trinity	SATB with 2 hunting horns, 2 violins, viola, double bass and continuo	—	Telemann Portal; Catalogue TWV
TVWV 1	TVWV 1:1420	Tritt auf die Glaubensbahn	Sunday after Christmas	SATB with 2 violins, viola, cello and continuo	—	Telemann Portal; Catalogue TWV
TVWV 1	TVWV 1:1421	Triumph! Denn mein Erlöser lebet	Easter	SATB with 2 oboes, 2 bugles, 2 horns, timpani, 2 violins, viola, cello and continuo	—	Telemann Portal; Catalogue TWV
TVWV 1	TVWV 1:1422	Triumphierender Versöhner, tritt aus deiner Kluft hervor	2nd day of Easter	Solo voice with violin and continuo	—	Telemann Portal; Catalogue TWV
TVWV 1	TVWV 1:1423	Triumph, Triumph, lobsinget dem Sieger	Easter	SATB with oboe, 2 trumpets, timpani, 2 violins, viola, cello and continuo	—	Telemann Portal; Catalogue TWV
TVWV 1	TVWV 1:1424	Triumph, Triumph, ihr Frommen, freuet euch	Easter	SATB with 3 bugles, timpani, 2 violins, viola and continuo	—	Telemann Portal; Catalogue TWV
TVWV 1	TVWV 1:1425	Tröstet mein Volk, spricht euer Gott	Feast of St. John the Baptist	SATB with 2 trumpets, timpani, 2 violins, viola and continuo	—	Telemann Portal; Catalogue TWV
TVWV 1	TVWV 1:1425a	Tronen der Gottheit in	Feast of St. Michael	Solo voice with violin, viola and continuo	Version	Catalogue TWV
TVWV 1	TVWV 1:1425b	Uber der Propheten Blut	2nd day of the Christmas festival	Solo voice with 2 oboes and continuo	Version	Catalogue TWV
TVWV 1	TVWV 1:1426	Umschlinget uns, ihr sanften Friedensbande	17th Sunday after Trinity	Solo voice with oboe and continuo	—	Telemann Portal; Catalogue TWV
TVWV 1	TVWV 1:1427	Und alle Engel stunden um den Stuhl	Feast of St. Michael	SAB with 3 trumpets, 2 violins, viola and continuo	—	Telemann Portal; Catalogue TWV
TVWV 1	TVWV 1:1428	Und als der Tag der Pfingsten erfüllet war	Feast of Pentecost	SATB with flute, oboe, 2 trumpets, timpani, 2 violins, viola, cello and continuo	—	Telemann Portal; Catalogue TWV
TVWV 1	TVWV 1:1429	Und als er nahe hinzu kam	10th Sunday after Trinity	SATB with 2 oboes, 2 violins, viola, cello and continuo	—	Telemann Portal; Catalogue TWV
TVWV 1	TVWV 1:1430	Und da die Engel von ihnen gen Himmel fuhren	2nd day of the Christmas festival	SATB with 2 oboes, 2 violins, viola, cello and continuo	—	Telemann Portal; Catalogue TWV
TVWV 1	TVWV 1:1431	Und das Wort ward Fleisch	3rd day of Christmas	SAB with 2 violins, viola and continuo	—	Telemann Portal; Catalogue TWV
TVWV 1	TVWV 1:1432	Und der Herr Zebaoth	2nd Sunday after Trinity	SATB with 2 flutes/oboe, 2 violins, viola, cello and continuo	= TVWV 1:294	Telemann Portal; Catalogue TWV
TVWV 1	TVWV 1:1433	Und die Apostel sprachen zu dem Herrn	1st Sunday after Easter	SATB with 2 oboes, 2 violins, viola, cello and continuo	—	Telemann Portal; Catalogue TWV
TVWV 1	TVWV 1:1434	Und es erhub sich ein Streit im Himmel	Feast of St. Michael	SATB with 2 bugles, timpani, 2 violins, viola, cello and continuo	—	Telemann Portal; Catalogue TWV
TVWV 1	TVWV 1:1435	Und es waren Hirten	Christmas Feast	—	Lost	Telemann Portal; Catalogue TWV
TVWV 1	TVWV 1:1436	Und Gott ruhete am siebenten Tage	17th Sunday after Trinity	SATB with 2 violins, 2 violas, cello and continuo	—	Telemann Portal; Catalogue TWV
TVWV 1	TVWV 1:1437	Und siehe, eine Stimme aus den Wolken	6th Sunday after Epiphany	SAB with 2 violins, viola and continuo	—	Telemann Portal; Catalogue TWV
TVWV 1	TVWV 1:1438	Und sie redeten miteinander	2nd day of Easter	SATB with 2 oboes, 2 violins, 2 violas, cello and continuo	—	Telemann Portal; Catalogue TWV
TVWV 1	TVWV 1:1439	Unempfindlich muss man sein	Miscellaneous cantatas	Solo soprano with 2 violins, cello and continuo	—	Telemann Portal; Catalogue TWV
TVWV 1	TVWV 1:1439a	Unerschaffnes Licht	2nd day of the feast of Pentecost	Solo voice with violin, viola and continuo	Version	Catalogue TWV
TVWV 1	TVWV 1:1440	Unschuld und ein gut Gewissen	3rd Sunday of Lent	SATB with 2 oboes, 2 violins, viola, cello and continuo	—	Telemann Portal; Catalogue TWV
TVWV 1	TVWV 1:1441	Unschuld und ein gut Gewissen	3rd Sunday of Lent	SATB with 2 violins, viola, cello and continuo	—	Telemann Portal; Catalogue TWV
TVWV 1	TVWV 1:1442	Unser keiner lebt ihm selber	16th Sunday after Trinity	SATB with 2 oboes, 2 violins, viola, cello and continuo	—	Telemann Portal; Catalogue TWV
TVWV 1	TVWV 1:1443	Unser keiner lebet ihm selber	16th Sunday after Trinity	SAB with 2 violins, viola and continuo	—	Telemann Portal; Catalogue TWV
TVWV 1	TVWV 1:1444	Unser Leben währet siebenzig Jahr	Feast of the Purification of Mary	SATB with recorder, 2 transverse flutes, 2 oboes, 2 violins, viola, cello and continuo	—	Telemann Portal; Catalogue TWV
TVWV 1	TVWV 1:1445	Unser Trost ist der	Passion Sunday	SAB with 2 violins, viola and continuo	—	Telemann Portal; Catalogue TWV
TVWV 1	TVWV 1:1446	Unser Vater in dem Himmel	19th Sunday after Trinity	—	Lost	Telemann Portal; Catalogue TWV
TVWV 1	TVWV 1:1447	Unser Vater in dem Himmel	5th Sunday after Trinity	—	Lost	Telemann Portal; Catalogue TWV
TVWV 1	TVWV 1:1448	Unser Wandel aber ist im Himmel	6th Sunday after Epiphany	—	Lost	Telemann Portal; Catalogue TWV
TVWV 1	TVWV 1:1449	Unser Wandel ist im Himmel	Ascension Day	SATB with 2 oboes, 2 horns, 2 violins, viola, cello and continuo	—	Telemann Portal; Catalogue TWV
TVWV 1	TVWV 1:1450	Uns ist ein Kind geboren	Christmas Feast	SATB with 2 oboes, 2 bugles, timpani, 2 violins, viola, cello and continuo	—	Telemann Portal; Catalogue TWV
TVWV 1	TVWV 1:1451	Uns ist ein Kind geboren	Christmas Feast	SATB with 2 flutes, 2 oboes, 3 bugles, timpani, 2 violins, viola, cello and continuo	—	Telemann Portal; Catalogue TWV
TVWV 1	TVWV 1:1452	Uns ist ein Kind geboren	Christmas Feast	SATB with 2 oboes, 2 horns, 2 violins, viola, cello and continuo	—	Telemann Portal; Catalogue TWV
TVWV 1	TVWV 1:1453	Uns ist ein Kind geboren	Christmas Feast	SAB with 3 bugles, timpani, 2 violins, viola and continuo	—	Telemann Portal; Catalogue TWV
TVWV 1	TVWV 1:1454	Uns ist ein Kind geboren	Christmas Feast	SATB with 2 trumpets, timpani, 2 violins, viola, cello and continuo	—	Telemann Portal; Catalogue TWV
TVWV 1	TVWV 1:1455	Uns ist ein Kind geboren	Christmas Feast	SATB with 2 oboes, 2 violins, viola, double bass and continuo	—	Telemann Portal; Catalogue TWV
TVWV 1	TVWV 1:1456	Unverzagt in allem Leide	3rd day of Christmas	Solo with violin and continuo	—	Telemann Portal; Catalogue TWV
TVWV 1	TVWV 1:1457	Unverzagt und ohne Grauen	3rd Sunday of Advent	Solo soprano and SATB with 2 violins, viola, cello and continuo	—	Telemann Portal; Catalogue TWV
TVWV 1	TVWV 1:1458	Valet will ich dir geben	17th Sunday after Trinity	SATB with 2 oboes, 2 violins, viola, cello and continuo	—	Telemann Portal; Catalogue TWV
TVWV 1	TVWV 1:1459	Vater, Gott von Ewigkeit	Feast of the Visitation of Mary	SATB with 2 flutes, 2 violins, viola, cello and continuo	—	Telemann Portal; Catalogue TWV
TVWV 1	TVWV 1:1460	Vater unser im Himmelreich	Rogation Festival	SATB with 2 oboes, 2 violins, 2 violas, cello and continuo	—	Telemann Portal; Catalogue TWV
TVWV 1	TVWV 1:1461	Vater unser im Himmelreich	Miscellaneous cantatas	Solo bass and SATB with 2 oboes, 2 violins, viola, cello and continuo	—	Telemann Portal; Catalogue TWV
TVWV 1	TVWV 1:1462	Vater unser in dem Himmel	19th Sunday after Trinity	SATB with 2 oboes, bassoon, concertante violin, 2 violins, viola, cello and continuo	—	Telemann Portal; Catalogue TWV
TVWV 1	TVWV 1:1463	Verdammet, fluchet, ihr Gesetze!	Feast of the Purification of Mary	Solo voice with unison violin, viola and continuo	—	Telemann Portal; Catalogue TWV
TVWV 1	TVWV 1:1464	Verdammte Brut, die Belial zuerst hat ausgehecket	Septuagesima Sunday	SATB with 2 oboes, 2 bassoons, 2 violins, 3 violas, cello and continuo	—	Telemann Portal; Catalogue TWV
TVWV 1	TVWV 1:1465	Verdammter Wankelmut, verfluchter Unbestand	Palm Sunday	SATB with 2 oboes, 2 violins, viola, cello and continuo	—	Telemann Portal; Catalogue TWV
TVWV 1	TVWV 1:1466	Verflucht sei jedermann	11th Sunday after Trinity	SATB with 2 oboes, 2 violins, viola, cello and continuo	—	Telemann Portal; Catalogue TWV
TVWV 1	TVWV 1:1467	Verfolgter Geist, wohin?	21st Sunday after Trinity	Solo voice with oboe and continuo	—	Telemann Portal; Catalogue TWV
TVWV 1	TVWV 1:1468	Verirrter Knecht der Welt	3rd Sunday of Advent	—	Lost	Telemann Portal; Catalogue TWV
TVWV 1	TVWV 1:1469	Verirrte Sünder, kehret, ach kehret um	2nd day of the Christmas festival	SATB with 2 violins, viola and continuo	—	Telemann Portal; Catalogue TWV
TVWV 1	TVWV 1:1470	Verlass doch einst, o Menschenkind	3rd day of Easter	SATB with 2 violins, viola and continuo	—	Telemann Portal; Catalogue TWV
TVWV 1	TVWV 1:1470a	Verliere mur gebrochen dich	Feast of the Purification of Mary	Solo voice with violin, viola and continuo	Version	Catalogue TWV
TVWV 1	TVWV 1:1471	Verlöschet, ihr Funken der irdischen Liebe	1st Sunday after Trinity	Solo voice with oboe and continuo	—	Telemann Portal; Catalogue TWV
TVWV 1	TVWV 1:1472	Verschließt euch, ihr eitle Sinnen	1st Sunday after Advent	—	Lost	Telemann Portal; Catalogue TWV
TVWV 1	TVWV 1:1473	Versuchet euch selbst, ob ihr im Glauben seid	21st Sunday after Trinity	SATB with 2 oboes, 2 violins, viola, double bass and continuo	—	Telemann Portal; Catalogue TWV
TVWV 1	TVWV 1:1474	Vertraue Gottes Huld	Feast of St. John the Baptist	—	Lost	Telemann Portal; Catalogue TWV
TVWV 1	TVWV 1:1475	Victoria, Triumph, Victoria	Easter	SATB with 3 bugles, timpani, lead violin, 2 violins, viola, cello and continuo	—	Telemann Portal; Catalogue TWV
TVWV 1	TVWV 1:1476	Viel Kreuze liegt auf meinem Rücken	21st Sunday after Trinity	SATB with 2 violins, viola, double bass and continuo	—	Telemann Portal; Catalogue TWV
TVWV 1	TVWV 1:1477	Viel Menschen sind noch heut	20th Sunday after Trinity	—	Lost	Telemann Portal; Catalogue TWV
TVWV 1	TVWV 1:1478	Viel sind berufen, aber wenig	2nd Sunday after Trinity	SATB with 2 oboes, 3 bugles, timpani, 2 violins, viola, cello and continuo	—	Telemann Portal; Catalogue TWV
TVWV 1	TVWV 1:1479	Viel Tausend sind, die hier und da in Sicherheit zur Hölle laufen	27th Sunday after Trinity	Solo voice with violin, viola and continuo	—	Telemann Portal; Catalogue TWV
TVWV 1	TVWV 1:1480	Von Gott soll mich nichts trennen	3rd Sunday of Advent	—	Lost	Telemann Portal; Catalogue TWV
TVWV 1	TVWV 1:1481	Vor allen Dingen ergreifet	1st Sunday of Lent	SATB with 2 violins, viola, cello and continuo	—	Telemann Portal; Catalogue TWV
TVWV 1	TVWV 1:1482	Vor allen Dingen habt unter einander	9th Sunday after Trinity	SATB with 2 oboes, 2 violins, viola, cello and continuo	—	Telemann Portal; Catalogue TWV
TVWV 1	TVWV 1:1483	Vor des lichten Tages Schein	3rd Sunday of Advent	Solo voice with flute and continuo	—	Telemann Portal; Catalogue TWV
TVWV 1	TVWV 1:1484	Vor Gott gilt keine Heuchelei	8th Sunday after Trinity	SB with 2 flutes, violin and continuo	—	Telemann Portal; Catalogue TWV
TVWV 1	TVWV 1:1485	Vor Wölfen in der Schafe Kleidern	8th Sunday after Trinity	SATB with 2 oboes, 2 violins, viola, cello and continuo	—	Telemann Portal; Catalogue TWV
TVWV 1	TVWV 1:1486	Wache auf, der du schläfest	2nd Sunday of Advent	SATB with 2 flutes, 2 oboes, 2 bassoons, 2 violins, viola, cello and continuo	—	Telemann Portal; Catalogue TWV
TVWV 1	TVWV 1:1487	Wachet auf, ruft uns die Stimme	27th Sunday after Trinity	Solo soprano and SATB with 2 violins, viola, cello and continuo	—	Telemann Portal; Catalogue TWV
TVWV 1	TVWV 1:1488	Wachet auf, ruft uns die Stimme	Choral cantata	SBB with 2 violins, viola and continuo	—	Telemann Portal; Catalogue TWV
TVWV 1	TVWV 1:1489	Wachet und betet, dass ihr nicht	3rd day of Easter	SATB with 2 oboes, 2 violins, viola, cello and continuo	—	Telemann Portal; Catalogue TWV
TVWV 1	TVWV 1:1490	Wachet und betet, dass ihr nicht	1st Sunday of Lent	SB with violin and continuo	—	Telemann Portal; Catalogue TWV
TVWV 1	TVWV 1:1491	Wachset in der Gnade und Erkenntnis	4th Sunday of Advent	SAB with 2 violins, viola and continuo	= TVWV 10:15, TVWV 10:17	Telemann Portal; Catalogue TWV
TVWV 1	TVWV 1:1492	Wacht auf, ruft uns die Stimme	20th Sunday after Trinity	SATB with 2 flutes/oboes, 3 bugles, timpani, 2 violins, viola, cello and continuo	—	Telemann Portal; Catalogue TWV
TVWV 1	TVWV 1:1493	Wahrlich, ich sage euch, so ihr den Vater	Rogation Festival	SATB with 2 oboes, 2 violins, viola, double bass and continuo	= TVWV 1:1496	Telemann Portal; Catalogue TWV
TVWV 1	TVWV 1:1494	Wahrlich, ich sage euch: ein Reicher wird schwerlich ins Reich Gottes kommen	1st Sunday after Trinity	SATB with flute, 2 oboes, 2 violins, viola, cello and continuo	= TVWV 1:1495	Telemann Portal; Catalogue TWV
TVWV 1	TVWV 1:1495	Wahrlich, ich sage euch: ein Reicher wird schwerlich ins Reich Gottes kommen	1st Sunday after Trinity	SATB with 2 violins, viola, cello and continuo	= TVWV 1:1494	Telemann Portal; Catalogue TWV
TVWV 1	TVWV 1:1496	Wahrlich, ich sage euch, so ihr den Vater	Rogation Festival	—	= TVWV 1:1493	Telemann Portal; Catalogue TWV
TVWV 1	TVWV 1:1497	Wahrlich, ich sage euch, so ihr den Vater etwas bitten werdet	Rogation Festival	SATB with 2 recorders, 2 oboes, 2 violins, viola, double bass and continuo	—	Telemann Portal; Catalogue TWV
TVWV 1	TVWV 1:1498	Wandelt in der Liebe	3rd Sunday of Lent	Solo voice with flute and continuo	—	Telemann Portal; Catalogue TWV
TVWV 1	TVWV 1:1499	Warum betrübst du dich, mein Herz	2nd Sunday after Epiphany	—	—	Telemann Portal; Catalogue TWV
TVWV 1	TVWV 1:1500	Warum betrübst du dich, mein Herz	2nd Sunday after Epiphany	SATB with 2 oboes, 2 violins, viola, double bass and continuo	—	Telemann Portal; Catalogue TWV
TVWV 1	TVWV 1:1501	Warum sollt ich traurig sein	4th Sunday of Advent	SATB with 2 oboes, 2 violins, viola, cello and continuo	—	Telemann Portal; Catalogue TWV
TVWV 1	TVWV 1:1502	Warum verstellst du die Gebärden?	3rd Sunday after Epiphany	Solo voice with oboe and continuo	—	Telemann Portal; Catalogue TWV
TVWV 1	TVWV 1:1503	Warum währet doch unser Schmerz so lange	3rd Sunday after Epiphany	SATB with 2 oboes, 2 violins, viola, cello and continuo	—	Telemann Portal; Catalogue TWV
TVWV 1	TVWV 1:1504	Warum währet doch unser Schmerz so lange	3rd Sunday after Epiphany	SATB with 2 violins, viola and continuo	—	Telemann Portal; Catalogue TWV
TVWV 1	TVWV 1:1505	Was betrübst du dich, meine Seele	7th Sunday after Trinity	SATB with 2 oboes, 2 violins, viola, cello and continuo	—	Telemann Portal; Catalogue TWV
TVWV 1	TVWV 1:1506	Was betrübest du dich, meine Seele	2nd day of Easter	SATB with 2 oboes, 3 bugles, timpani, 2 violins, viola and continuo	—	Telemann Portal; Catalogue TWV
TVWV 1	TVWV 1:1507	Was fehlt dir doch	12th Sunday after Trinity	SATB with flute, 2 oboes, 2 violins, 2 violas and continuo	—	Telemann Portal; Catalogue TWV
TVWV 1	TVWV 1:1508	Was frag ich nach der Welt	Christmas Feast	SATB with 2 flutes, 3 trumpets, timpani, 2 violins, viola, cello and continuo	—	Telemann Portal; Catalogue TWV
TVWV 1	TVWV 1:1509	Was für ein jauchzendes Gedränge	1st Sunday after Advent	SATB with 2 oboes, 2 violins, viola and continuo	—	Telemann Portal; Catalogue TWV
TVWV 1	TVWV 1:1510	Was gibst du denn, o mein Seele	23rd Sunday after Trinity	Solo bass and SATB with flute, 2 oboes, 2 violins, viola and continuo	—	Telemann Portal; Catalogue TWV
TVWV 1	TVWV 1:1511	Was gleicht dem Adel wahrer Christen	Sunday after Christmas	Solo voice with oboe and continuo	—	Telemann Portal; Catalogue TWV
TVWV 1	TVWV 1:1512	Was Gott im Himmel will, das geschehe	3rd Sunday after Epiphany	SAB with 2 violins, viola and continuo	—	Telemann Portal; Catalogue TWV
TVWV 1	TVWV 1:1513	Was hast du, Mensch	9th Sunday after Trinity	SATB with 2 oboes, 2 violins, viola, cello and continuo	—	Telemann Portal; Catalogue TWV
TVWV 1	TVWV 1:1514	Was hat das Licht der Welt vor Gemeinschaft mit der Finsternis	15th Sunday after Trinity	SATB with 2 oboes, 2 violins, viola, cello and continuo	—	Telemann Portal; Catalogue TWV
TVWV 1	TVWV 1:1515	Was hilft der Erden Lust	24th Sunday after Trinity	—	Lost	Telemann Portal; Catalogue TWV
TVWV 1	TVWV 1:1516	Was ist das Herz? Ein finstrer Ort	6th Sunday after Epiphany	Solo voice with violin and continuo	—	Telemann Portal; Catalogue TWV
TVWV 1	TVWV 1:1517	Was ist dein Freund vor andern Freunden	6th Sunday after Epiphany	SATB with 2 oboes, 2 violins, viola, cello and continuo	—	Telemann Portal; Catalogue TWV
TVWV 1	TVWV 1:1518	Was ist der Tand, das bisgen Ehr	Feast of the Assumption of Mary	—	Lost	Telemann Portal; Catalogue TWV
TVWV 1	TVWV 1:1519	Was ist ein gut Gewissen	3rd Sunday of Advent	—	Lost	Telemann Portal; Catalogue TWV
TVWV 1	TVWV 1:1520	Was ist ein Mensch	4th Sunday after Trinity	SATB with 2 violins, viola, cello and continuo	—	Telemann Portal; Catalogue TWV
TVWV 1	TVWV 1:1521	Was ist mir doch das Rühmen nütze?	Sunday of Sexagesima	Solo voice with flute and continuo	—	Telemann Portal; Catalogue TWV
TVWV 1	TVWV 1:1522	Was ist schöner, als Gott dienen	Sunday of Sexagesima	Solo soprano and SATB with 2 violins, viola, cello and continuo	—	Telemann Portal; Catalogue TWV
TVWV 1	TVWV 1:1523	Was Jesus nur mit mir wird fügen	12th Sunday after Trinity	SATB with 2 oboes, 2 violins, viola, cello and continuo	—	Telemann Portal; Catalogue TWV
TVWV 1	TVWV 1:1524	Was Jesus nur mit mir wird fügen	5th Sunday after Trinity	—	Lost	Telemann Portal; Catalogue TWV
TVWV 1	TVWV 1:1525	Was Jesus nur mit mir wird fügen	12th Sunday after Trinity	SATB with 2 oboes, 2 violins, viola, cello and continuo	—	Telemann Portal; Catalogue TWV
TVWV 1	TVWV 1:1526	Was Jesus tut, ist wohlgetan	12th Sunday after Trinity	Solo soprano with violin and continuo	—	Telemann Portal; Catalogue TWV
TVWV 1	TVWV 1:1527	Was Lobes soll man dir, o Vater, singen	2nd day of the feast of Pentecost	—	Lost	Telemann Portal; Catalogue TWV
TVWV 1	TVWV 1:1528	Der Herr hat's wohl gemacht	12th Sunday after Trinity	—	Lost	Telemann Portal; Catalogue TWV
TVWV 1	TVWV 1:1529	Was mein Gott will, das gescheh allzeit	3rd Sunday after Epiphany	SATB with 2 oboes, 2 violins, viola, cello and continuo	—	Telemann Portal; Catalogue TWV
TVWV 1	TVWV 1:1530	Was meinst du, was will aus dem Kindlein	Feast of St. John the Baptist	SATB with oboe, 2 violins, viola, cello and continuo	—	Telemann Portal; Catalogue TWV
TVWV 1	TVWV 1:1531	Was suchet ihr den Lebendigen bei den Toten	3rd day of Easter	SATB with 2 violins, viola, cello and continuo	—	Telemann Portal; Catalogue TWV
TVWV 1	TVWV 1:1532	Was treibt euch, freche Menschenkinder	Miscellaneous cantatas	—	Lost	Telemann Portal; Catalogue TWV
TVWV 1	TVWV 1:1533	Was vom Fleisch geboren wird, das ist Fleisch	Feast of the Assumption of Mary	SATB with 2 flutes, 2 oboes, 2 violins, viola, cello and continuo	—	Telemann Portal; Catalogue TWV
TVWV 1	TVWV 1:1533a	Was zeigen freche Hollenkinder	Passion Sunday	Solo voice with violin, viola and continuo	Version	Catalogue TWV
TVWV 1	TVWV 1:1534	Weg mit Sodoms gift'gen Früchten	Easter	Solo voice with violin and continuo	—	Telemann Portal; Catalogue TWV
TVWV 1	TVWV 1:1535	Weg, nichtige Freude, weg, flüchtiges Leben	4th Sunday after Easter	SATB with 2 violins, viola, cello and continuo	—	Telemann Portal; Catalogue TWV
TVWV 1	TVWV 1:1536	Weiche, Lust und Fröhlichkeit	Other cantatas [Passio Christi]	Solo S/T with unison violin, concertante viola and continuo	—	Telemann Portal; Catalogue TWV
TVWV 1	TVWV 1:1537	Weichet fort aus meiner Seele	15th Sunday after Trinity	SATB with 2 oboes, 2 hunting horns, 2 violins, 2 violas and continuo	—	Telemann Portal; Catalogue TWV
TVWV 1	TVWV 1:1538	Weicht, ihr Sünden, bleibt dahinten	8th Sunday after Trinity	Solo voice with violin and continuo	—	Telemann Portal; Catalogue TWV
TVWV 1	TVWV 1:1539	Weich, verborg'ner Pharisäer	Septuagesima Sunday	SATB with 2 oboes, 2 violins, viola, cello and continuo	—	Telemann Portal; Catalogue TWV
TVWV 1	TVWV 1:1539a	Weide mich auf gruner Auen	2nd Sunday after Easter	Solo voice with 2 violins and continuo	Version	Catalogue TWV
TVWV 1	TVWV 1:1540	Weil ich denn rufe und ihr weigert euch	2nd Sunday after Trinity	SATB with 2 oboes, 2 violins, viola, cello and continuo	—	Telemann Portal; Catalogue TWV
TVWV 1	TVWV 1:1540a	Weil ich glaube, wird der	24th Sunday after Trinity	Solo voice with violin, viola and continuo	Version	Catalogue TWV
TVWV 1	TVWV 1:1541	Weine nicht, siehe, er hat überwunden	Easter	SATB with 2 oboes, 3 trombones, timpani, 2 violins, viola, cello and continuo	—	Telemann Portal; Catalogue TWV
TVWV 1	TVWV 1:1542	Weint, weint, betrübte Augen	2nd Sunday of Lent	—	—	Telemann Portal; Catalogue TWV
TVWV 1	TVWV 1:1543	Weißt du nicht, dass euer Leid	2nd day of the feast of Pentecost	—	Lost	Telemann Portal; Catalogue TWV
TVWV 1	TVWV 1:1544	Welche der Geist Gottes treibet	6th Sunday after Trinity	—	Lost	Telemann Portal; Catalogue TWV
TVWV 1	TVWV 1:1545	Welcher unter euch kann mich einer Sünde zeihen	Passion Sunday	SATB with 2 flutes/oboe, 2 violins, viola, cello and continuo	—	Telemann Portal; Catalogue TWV
TVWV 1	TVWV 1:1546	Welch Getümmel erschüttert den Himmel	Feast of St. Michael	SATB with 2 flutes, 2 oboes, 2 trumpets, timpani, 2 violins, viola, cello and continuo	—	Telemann Portal; Catalogue TWV
TVWV 1	TVWV 1:1547	Welt, hinaus aus meinem Herzen	Miscellaneous cantatas	Solo tenor with unision violin, cello and continuo	—	Telemann Portal; Catalogue TWV
TVWV 1	TVWV 1:1548	Ihr Mauren des irdischen Jericho	2nd Sunday of Advent	—	= TVWV 1:910	Telemann Portal; Catalogue TWV
TVWV 1	TVWV 1:1549	Welt, ich frage nichts darnach	Sunday After New Year's Eve	—	Lost	Telemann Portal; Catalogue TWV
TVWV 1	TVWV 1:1549a	Walt, verlange nicht mein	18th Sunday after Trinity	Solo voice with violin, viola and continuo	Version	Catalogue TWV
TVWV 1	TVWV 1:1550	Wende dich zu mir	3rd Sunday after Trinity	SAT with 2 violins, viola and continuo	—	Telemann Portal; Catalogue TWV
TVWV 1	TVWV 1:1551	Wende meine Augen ab	8th Sunday after Trinity	SATB with 2 oboes, 2 violins, viola, cello and continuo	—	Telemann Portal; Catalogue TWV
TVWV 1	TVWV 1:1552	Wenn aber der Tröster kommen wird	4th Sunday after Easter	SATB with 2 oboes, 2 violins, viola, cello and continuo	—	Telemann Portal; Catalogue TWV
TVWV 1	TVWV 1:1553	Wenn aber des Menschen Sohn kommen wird	26th Sunday after Trinity	SATB with flute, oboe, 2 violins, viola and continuo	—	Telemann Portal; Catalogue TWV
TVWV 1	TVWV 1:1554	Wenn Angst und Not dich hart betroffen hat	4th Sunday after Easter	SATB with 2 violins, viola, double bass and continuo	—	Telemann Portal; Catalogue TWV
TVWV 1	TVWV 1:1555	Wenn böse Zungen stechen	4th Sunday after Trinity	Solo soprano and SATB with 2 violins, viola, cello and continuo	—	Telemann Portal; Catalogue TWV
TVWV 1	TVWV 1:1556	Wenn der Herr Friede gibt	3rd Sunday after Easter	SATB with 2 oboes, 2 violins, viola, cello and continuo	—	Telemann Portal; Catalogue TWV
TVWV 1	TVWV 1:1557	Wenn du deine Gabe auf dem Altar opferst	6th Sunday after Trinity	SAB with 2 violins, viola and continuo	—	Telemann Portal; Catalogue TWV
TVWV 1	TVWV 1:1558	Wenn du mein Herze tröstest	1st Sunday after Advent	—	Lost	Telemann Portal; Catalogue TWV
TVWV 1	TVWV 1:1559	Wenn Gott in diesem Leben	1st Sunday after Trinity	—	Lost	Telemann Portal; Catalogue TWV
TVWV 1	TVWV 1:1560	Wenn ich dich nur habe	Miscellaneous cantatas	—	Lost	Telemann Portal; Catalogue TWV
TVWV 1	TVWV 1:1561	Wenn ich ein gut Gewissen habe	Passion Sunday	SATB with 2 violins, viola, cello and continuo	—	Telemann Portal; Catalogue TWV
TVWV 1	TVWV 1:1562	Wenn Israel am Nilusstrande	7th Sunday after Trinity	Solo voice with recorder and continuo	—	Telemann Portal; Catalogue TWV
TVWV 1	TVWV 1:1563	Wenn jemand das Gesetz Mosis bricht	2nd Sunday after Trinity	SATB with 2 oboes, 2 violins, viola, cello and continuo	—	Telemann Portal; Catalogue TWV
TVWV 1	TVWV 1:1564	Wenn langer Seuchen Heftigkeit	21st Sunday after Trinity	SATB with flute, 2 oboes, 2 violins, viola, cello and continuo	—	Telemann Portal; Catalogue TWV
TVWV 1	TVWV 1:1565	Wenn meine Sünd mich kränken	Choral cantata	—	—	Telemann Portal; Catalogue TWV
TVWV 1	TVWV 1:1566	Wenn mich die böse Rott anfällt	3rd Sunday of Lent	SATB with 2 oboes, horn, 2 violins, viola, cello and continuo	—	Telemann Portal; Catalogue TWV
TVWV 1	TVWV 1:1567	Wenn mir angst ist, so rufe ich	4th Sunday after Epiphany	SAB with 2 violins, viola and continuo	—	Telemann Portal; Catalogue TWV
TVWV 1	TVWV 1:1568	Wenn wir in höchsten Nöten sind	4th Sunday after Epiphany	SATB with 2 oboes, 3 bugles, timpani, 2 violins, viola, double bass and continuo	—	Telemann Portal; Catalogue TWV
TVWV 1	TVWV 1:1569	Wenn wir in höchsten Nöten sein	4th Sunday after Epiphany	—	—	Telemann Portal; Catalogue TWV
TVWV 1	TVWV 1:1570	Wenn wir nicht Kreuz und Trübsal hätten	3rd Sunday after Easter	Solo viola and SATB with 2 violins, viola, cello and continuo	—	Telemann Portal; Catalogue TWV
TVWV 1	TVWV 1:1571	Wen seh ich dort an jenem Berge liegen	Feast of the Assumption of Mary	—	Lost	Telemann Portal; Catalogue TWV
TVWV 1	TVWV 1:1572	Wer Arges tut, der kommt nicht ans Licht	2nd day of the feast of Pentecost	SATB with 2 oboes, 2 violins, viola, cello and continuo	—	Telemann Portal; Catalogue TWV
TVWV 1	TVWV 1:1573	Wer bei Gott in Gnaden ist	Feast of St. John the Baptist	SATB with 2 oboes, 2 violins, 2 violas, cello and continuo	—	Telemann Portal; Catalogue TWV
TVWV 1	TVWV 1:1574	Wer bringt dir nicht Ehre	Miscellaneous cantatas	Solo bass with 2 flutes, 2 oboes, 2 bugles, 2 horns, 2 violins, viola, cello and continuo	—	Telemann Portal; Catalogue TWV
TVWV 1	TVWV 1:1575	Wer da saget, ich kenne ihn	18th Sunday after Trinity	SATB with 2 oboes, 2 violins, viola, cello and continuo	—	Telemann Portal; Catalogue TWV
TVWV 1	TVWV 1:1576	Werde munter, mein Gemüte	Choral cantata for communion	—	—	Telemann Portal; Catalogue TWV
TVWV 1	TVWV 1:1577	Wer denkt, die Krone des Lebens zu erben	2nd day of the Christmas festival	SATB with 2 oboes, 2 violins, viola, cello and continuo	—	Telemann Portal; Catalogue TWV
TVWV 1	TVWV 1:1578	Wer der Barmherzigkeit und Güte nachjaget	4th Sunday after Trinity	SAB with 2 violins, viola and continuo	—	Telemann Portal; Catalogue TWV
TVWV 1	TVWV 1:1579	Werd ich dann zu deiner Rechten	26th Sunday after Trinity	SATB with 2 oboes, 2 violins, viola, cello and continuo	—	Telemann Portal; Catalogue TWV
TVWV 1	TVWV 1:1580	Werfet Panier auf im Lande	2nd day of the Christmas festival	SATB with 2 oboes, 2 bugles, timpani, 2 violins, viola, cello and continuo	—	Telemann Portal; Catalogue TWV
TVWV 1	TVWV 1:1581	Wer Gotte meint was abzuzwingen	Septuagesima Sunday	SATB with 2 violins, viola, double bass and continuo	—	Telemann Portal; Catalogue TWV
TVWV 1	TVWV 1:1582	Wer hofft in Gott und dem vertraut	17th Sunday after Trinity	Bass solo and SATB with 2 violins, viola and continuo	—	Telemann Portal; Catalogue TWV
TVWV 1	TVWV 1:1583	Wer ist aber, der die Welt überwindet	4th Sunday of Advent	SATB with 2 violins, viola, double bass and continuo	—	Telemann Portal; Catalogue TWV
TVWV 1	TVWV 1:1584	Wer ist, der dort von Edom kömmt	Passion Sunday	Solo voice with violin and continuo	—	Telemann Portal; Catalogue TWV
TVWV 1	TVWV 1:1585	Wer ist, der so von Edom kommt	Palm Sunday	SATB with 2 oboes, 2 violins, viola, cello and continuo	= BWV 141, BWV Anh. III 157	Telemann Portal; Catalogue TWV
TVWV 1	TVWV 1:1586	Wer ist, der so von Edom kömmt	Sunday of Quinquagesima	SATB with 2 oboes, 2 violins, viola, cello and continuo	—	Telemann Portal; Catalogue TWV
TVWV 1	TVWV 1:1587	Wer ist wohl wie du, Jesu	Feast of the Epiphany	Solo tenor and SATB with 2 violins, viola, cello and continuo	—	Telemann Portal; Catalogue TWV
TVWV 1	TVWV 1:1588	Wer Jesum kennt	7th Sunday after Trinity	SATB with flute, 2 oboes, 2 violins, 2 violas, cello and continuo	—	Telemann Portal; Catalogue TWV
TVWV 1	TVWV 1:1589	Wer mich liebet, der wird mein Wort halten	Feast of Pentecost	SATB with flute, 2 oboes, 2 piccolo bugles, hunting horn, 2 violins, viola, cello and continuo	—	Telemann Portal; Catalogue TWV
TVWV 1	TVWV 1:1590	Wer mich liebet, der wird mein Wort halten	Feast of Pentecost	SATB with 2 oboes, 2 violins, 2 violas, cello and continuo	—	Telemann Portal; Catalogue TWV
TVWV 1	TVWV 1:1591	Wer mich liebet, der wird mein Wort halten	Feast of Pentecost	SATB with 2 transverse flutes, oboe, 2 trumpets, timpani, 2 violins, viola, cello and continuo	—	Telemann Portal; Catalogue TWV
TVWV 1	TVWV 1:1591a	Wer mit Gott den Anfang	5th Sunday after Trinity	Solo voice with violin, viola and continuo	Version	Catalogue TWV
TVWV 1	TVWV 1:1592	Wer nicht mit Jesu ist, ist wider ihn	3rd Sunday of Lent	—	Lost	Telemann Portal; Catalogue TWV
TVWV 1	TVWV 1:1593	Wer nur den lieben Gott lässt walten	4th Sunday of Lent	SATB with 2 oboes, 2 violins, viola, cello and continuo	—	Telemann Portal; Catalogue TWV
TVWV 1	TVWV 1:1594	Wer sehnet sich nach Kerker, Stein und Ketten	3rd Sunday after Trinity	Solo voice with recorder and continuo	—	Telemann Portal; Catalogue TWV
TVWV 1	TVWV 1:1595	Wer seinen Bruder hasset	6th Sunday after Trinity	SATB with 2 oboes, 2 violins, viola, cello and continuo	—	Telemann Portal; Catalogue TWV
TVWV 1	TVWV 1:1596	Wer seinen Bruder hasset	6th Sunday after Trinity	SATB with flute, 2 oboes, 2 violins, viola, cello and continuo	—	Telemann Portal; Catalogue TWV
TVWV 1	TVWV 1:1597	Wer sich auf seinen Reichtum verlässt	1st Sunday after Trinity	SATB with 2 violins, 2 violas, cello and continuo	—	Telemann Portal; Catalogue TWV
TVWV 1	TVWV 1:1598	Wer sich des Armen erbarmet, der leihet dem Herrn	13th Sunday after Trinity	SATB with 2 oboes, 2 violins, viola and continuo	—	Telemann Portal; Catalogue TWV
TVWV 1	TVWV 1:1599	Wer sich des Armen erbarmet und solchem willig Gutes tut	1st Sunday after Trinity	SATB with 2 flutes/oboe, bassoon, 2 trumpets, timpani, 2 violins, viola, cello and continuo	—	Telemann Portal; Catalogue TWV
TVWV 1	TVWV 1:1600	Wer sich rächet, an dem wird sich der Herr	6th Sunday after Trinity	SATB with 2 oboes, 2 violins, viola, double bass and continuo	—	Telemann Portal; Catalogue TWV
TVWV 1	TVWV 1:1601	Wer sich rächet	22nd Sunday after Trinity	SAB with 2 violins, viola and continuo	= TVWV 10:18	Telemann Portal; Catalogue TWV
TVWV 1	TVWV 1:1602	Wer sich rächet, an dem wird sich der Herr	6th Sunday after Trinity	SATB with 2 oboes, 2 violins, viola, cello and continuo	—	Telemann Portal; Catalogue TWV
TVWV 1	TVWV 1:1603	Wer sich selbst erhöhet, der soll erniedriget werden	17th Sunday after Trinity	SATB with 2 flutes/oboe, 2 violins, viola, cello and continuo	—	Telemann Portal; Catalogue TWV
TVWV 1	TVWV 1:1604	Wer sich selbst erhöhet, der soll erniedrigt werden	4th Sunday of Advent	SATB with 2 oboes, 2 violins, viola and continuo	—	Telemann Portal; Catalogue TWV
TVWV 1	TVWV 1:1605	Wer sich vor dir, o Gott, in Demut niederleget	11th Sunday after Trinity	SATB with 2 flutes/oboe, 2 violins, viola, cello and continuo	—	Telemann Portal; Catalogue TWV
TVWV 1	TVWV 1:1606	Wertes Zion, sei getrost	23rd Sunday after Trinity	SATB with 2 oboes, 3 bugles, timpani, 2 violins, 2 violas, cello and continuo	—	Telemann Portal; Catalogue TWV
TVWV 1	TVWV 1:1607	Wertes Zion, sei getrost	23rd Sunday after Trinity	S/TTB with 2 violins, viola, cello and continuo	—	Telemann Portal; Catalogue TWV
TVWV 1	TVWV 1:1608	Wer weiß, wie nahe mir mein Ende	16th Sunday after Trinity	—	Lost	Telemann Portal; Catalogue TWV
TVWV 1	TVWV 1:1609	Wer weiß, wie nahe mir mein Ende	3rd day of Christmas	—	—	Telemann Portal; Catalogue TWV
TVWV 1	TVWV 1:1610	Wer weiß, wie nahe mir mein Ende	9th Sunday after Trinity	Solo tenor and SATB with 2 violins, viola, cello and continuo	—	Telemann Portal; Catalogue TWV
TVWV 1	TVWV 1:1611	Wer weiß, wie nahe mir mein Ende	16th Sunday after Trinity	Solo viola and SATB with 2 violins, viola and continuo	—	Telemann Portal; Catalogue TWV
TVWV 1	TVWV 1:1612	Wer will die Auserwählten	2nd day of Easter	—	Lost	Telemann Portal; Catalogue TWV
TVWV 1	TVWV 1:1613	Wer will uns scheiden von der Liebe Gottes	Sunday after Ascension Day	SATB with 2 oboes, 2 violins, viola, double bass and continuo	—	Telemann Portal; Catalogue TWV
TVWV 1	TVWV 1:1614	Wer zu Gott kommen will	21st Sunday after Trinity	SATB with 2 oboes, 2 violins, viola, cello and continuo	—	Telemann Portal; Catalogue TWV
TVWV 1	TVWV 1:1615	Wer zweifelt, dass man unser Herze verzagt	4th Sunday after Epiphany	SATB with 2 oboes, 2 violins, viola, cello and continuo	—	Telemann Portal; Catalogue TWV
TVWV 1	TVWV 1:1616	Wie der Hirsch schreiet nach frischem Wasser	16th Sunday after Trinity	SATB with 2 oboes, 2 violins, viola, double bass and continuo	—	Telemann Portal; Catalogue TWV
TVWV 1	TVWV 1:1617	Wie der Hirsch schreiet nach frischem Wasser	21st Sunday after Trinity	SATB with 3 bugles, timpani, 2 violins, viola and continuo	—	Telemann Portal; Catalogue TWV
TVWV 1	TVWV 1:1618	Wie der Hirsch schreiet nach frischem Wasser	Feast of the Assumption of Mary	SATB with 2 oboes, 2 violins, viola, cello and continuo	—	Telemann Portal; Catalogue TWV
TVWV 1	TVWV 1:1619	Wie ein Lämmlein sich dahin lässt	Sunday of Quinquagesima	SATB,SATB with flute, oboe, 2 violins, viola and continuo	—	Telemann Portal; Catalogue TWV
TVWV 1	TVWV 1:1620	Wie fehlet doch ein Herz	20th Sunday after Trinity	SATB with 2 oboes, 2 violins, viola, cello and continuo	—	Telemann Portal; Catalogue TWV
TVWV 1	TVWV 1:1621	Wie freudig seh ich dir entgegen	Miscellaneous cantatas	SATB with 2 flutes, 2 horns, 3 trombones, timpani, 2 violins, viola, cello and continuo concertante	—	Telemann Portal; Catalogue TWV
TVWV 1	TVWV 1:1622	Wiegen gleich die eitlen Lüste	25th Sunday after Trinity	SATB with 2 violins, viola, cello and continuo	—	Telemann Portal; Catalogue TWV
TVWV 1	TVWV 1:1623	Wie gnädig geht des höchsten Vaters	3rd Sunday after Trinity	—	Lost	Telemann Portal; Catalogue TWV
TVWV 1	TVWV 1:1623a	Wie hoch bist du gest	Christmas Feast	Solo voice with violin, viola and continuo	Version	Catalogue TWV
TVWV 1	TVWV 1:1624	Wie ist dein Name so groß	17th Sunday after Trinity	SATB with oboe, bassoon, horn, 3 trumpets, timpani, 2 violins, viola, double bass, continuo	= TVWV 6:3a	Telemann Portal; Catalogue TWV
TVWV 1	TVWV 1:1625	Wie kehren sich bei Jesu Krippen	Sunday After New Year's Eve	Solo voice with violin, viola and continuo	—	Telemann Portal; Catalogue TWV
TVWV 1	TVWV 1:1626	Wie lange hinket ihr auf beiden Seiten	4th Sunday of Lent	SAATTBB with 2 flutes, 2 violins, viola and continuo	—	Telemann Portal; Catalogue TWV
TVWV 1	TVWV 1:1627	Wie lieblich sind deine Wohnungen	1st Sunday after Epiphany	SATB with 2 oboes, 2 violins, viola, cello and continuo	—	Telemann Portal; Catalogue TWV
TVWV 1	TVWV 1:1628	Wie lieblich sind deine Wohnungen	1st Sunday after Epiphany	SAB with 2 violins, viola and continuo	—	Telemann Portal; Catalogue TWV
TVWV 1	TVWV 1:1629	Wie liegt die Stadt so wüste	10th Sunday after Trinity	SATB with 2 oboes, 2 violins, viola, cello and continuo	—	Telemann Portal; Catalogue TWV
TVWV 1	TVWV 1:1630	Wie mancher baut sich Schlösser	2nd day of Easter	—	Lost	Telemann Portal; Catalogue TWV
TVWV 1	TVWV 1:1631	Wie mancher, der nach seinem Wahn	Septuagesima Sunday	—	Lost	Telemann Portal; Catalogue TWV
TVWV 1	TVWV 1:1632	Wie missbraucht mancher Mensch in seinem Leben	9th Sunday after Trinity	—	Lost	Telemann Portal; Catalogue TWV
TVWV 1	TVWV 1:1633	Wie ofte hört man nicht die noch verwöhnten	2nd Sunday after Epiphany	SATB with 2 flutes, 2 violins, viola, cello and continuo	—	Telemann Portal; Catalogue TWV
TVWV 1	TVWV 1:1634	Wie schmerzlich drückt die schwere Bürde	7th Sunday after Trinity	SATB with 2 oboes, 2 violins, viola, cello and continuo	—	Telemann Portal; Catalogue TWV
TVWV 1	TVWV 1:1635	Wie schön leuchtet der Morgenstern	18th Sunday after Trinity	—	Lost	Telemann Portal; Catalogue TWV
TVWV 1	TVWV 1:1636	Wie schön leucht' uns der Morgenstern	Feast of the Epiphany	—	Lost	Telemann Portal; Catalogue TWV
TVWV 1	TVWV 1:1637	Wie schön leuchtet der Morgenstern	Feast of the Epiphany	—	Lost	Telemann Portal; Catalogue TWV
TVWV 1	TVWV 1:1638	Wie schön leucht' uns der Morgenstern	Feast of the Epiphany	—	—	Telemann Portal; Catalogue TWV
TVWV 1	TVWV 1:1639	Wie schön leucht' uns der Morgenstern	New Year	—	Lost	Telemann Portal; Catalogue TWV
TVWV 1	TVWV 1:1640	Wie schön wird's nicht im Himmel sein	Ascension Day	SATB with flute, 2 oboes, bassoon, 2 violins, viola, viola da gamba, cello and continuo	—	Telemann Portal; Catalogue TWV
TVWV 1	TVWV 1:1641	Wie sich ein Vater über Kinder erbarmet	2nd Sunday of Lent	SATB with 2 oboes, 2 violins, viola, cello and continuo	—	Telemann Portal; Catalogue TWV
TVWV 1	TVWV 1:1642	Wie soll ich dich empfangen	1st Sunday after Advent	—	Lost	Telemann Portal; Catalogue TWV
TVWV 1	TVWV 1:1643	Wie sollte Jesus von mir gehn?	4th Sunday after Easter	—	Lost	Telemann Portal; Catalogue TWV
TVWV 1	TVWV 1:1644	Wie Spinnen Gift aus Blumen saugen	3rd Sunday of Lent	SATB with 2 oboes, 2 violins, viola, cello and continuo	—	Telemann Portal; Catalogue TWV
TVWV 1	TVWV 1:1645	Wie teuer ist deine Güte	6th Sunday after Epiphany	—	Lost	Telemann Portal; Catalogue TWV
TVWV 1	TVWV 1:1646	Wie teuer ist deine Güte, Gott	2nd day of the Christmas festival	SATB with 2 flutes, 2 oboes, 2 piccolo bugles, 2 violins, viola, cello and continuo	—	Telemann Portal; Catalogue TWV
TVWV 1	TVWV 1:1647	Wie wendet doch der Mensch	12th Sunday after Trinity	—	Lost	Telemann Portal; Catalogue TWV
TVWV 1	TVWV 1:1648	Wiewohl er, Jesus Christus, Gottes Sohn war	New Year	SATB with 2 flutes, 2 oboes, 3 trumpets, timpani, 2 violins, viola, cello and continuo	—	Telemann Portal; Catalogue TWV
TVWV 1	TVWV 1:1649	Wie würd' es uns ergehn	Feast of St. Michael	SATB with 2 violins, viola, cello and continuo	—	Telemann Portal; Catalogue TWV
TVWV 1	TVWV 1:1650	Willkommen, auserwählter Tag	Feast of the Assumption of Mary	—	Lost	Telemann Portal; Catalogue TWV
TVWV 1	TVWV 1:1651	Willkomm, du Licht, aus Licht geboren	1st Sunday after Advent	SATB with 2 oboes, 2 horns, 2 violins, viola, cello and continuo	—	Telemann Portal; Catalogue TWV
TVWV 1	TVWV 1:1652	Willkommen, segensvolles Fest	Easter	SATB with 2 oboes, 3 horns, 3 trumpets, timpani, 2 violins, viola, cello and continuo	—	Telemann Portal; Catalogue TWV
TVWV 1	TVWV 1:1653	Willkommen, segensvolles Fest	Easter	SATB with 2 violins, viola, cello and continuo	—	Telemann Portal; Catalogue TWV
TVWV 1	TVWV 1:1654	Wir aber, die wir des Tages Kinder sind	2nd Sunday of Advent	SATB with 2 oboes, viola, cello and continuo	—	Telemann Portal; Catalogue TWV
TVWV 1	TVWV 1:1655	Ich will singen von der Gnade des Herrn	3rd Sunday of Lent	SATB with oboe, 2 violins, viola, cello and continuo	= TVWV 1:893	Telemann Portal; Catalogue TWV
TVWV 1	TVWV 1:1656	Wir Christenleut hab'n jetzund Freud	Christmas Feast	—	Lost	Telemann Portal; Catalogue TWV
TVWV 1	TVWV 1:1657	Wir danken dir, Gott	3rd Sunday of Advent	SATB with oboe, 2 violins, viola, cello and continuo	—	Telemann Portal; Catalogue TWV
TVWV 1	TVWV 1:1658	Wird mein Jesus nicht bald kommen	2nd Sunday of Advent	SATB with 2 oboes, 2 violins, viola, cello and continuo	—	Telemann Portal; Catalogue TWV
TVWV 1	TVWV 1:1659	Wir gingen alle in der Irre	2nd Sunday after Easter	SATB with 2 oboes, 2 violins, viola, cello and continuo	—	Telemann Portal; Catalogue TWV
TVWV 1	TVWV 1:1660	Wir glauben an den heiligen Geist	Feast of Pentecost	SATB with flute, 2 oboes, 2 violins, viola, cello and continuo	—	Telemann Portal; Catalogue TWV
TVWV 1	TVWV 1:1661	Wir haben den funden	3rd Sunday of Advent	SATB with 2 violins, viola, cello and continuo	—	Telemann Portal; Catalogue TWV
TVWV 1	TVWV 1:1662	Wir haben die Hoffnung	4th Sunday after Easter	—	Lost	Telemann Portal; Catalogue TWV
TVWV 1	TVWV 1:1663	Wir haben ein festes prophetisches Wort	5th Sunday after Epiphany	SATB with 2 violins, viola, cello and continuo	—	Telemann Portal; Catalogue TWV
TVWV 1	TVWV 1:1664	Wir haben ein festes prophetisches Wort	Feast of the Epiphany	—	Lost	Telemann Portal; Catalogue TWV
TVWV 1	TVWV 1:1665	Wir haben hier keine bleibende Statt	Feast of the Visitation of Mary	SATB with 2 flutes, bassoon, 2 violins, viola, cello, double bass and continuo	—	Telemann Portal; Catalogue TWV
TVWV 1	TVWV 1:1666	Wir haben hier keine bleibende Stätte	Sunday After New Year's Eve	SSATB with 2 violins, viola, cello and continuo	—	Telemann Portal; Catalogue TWV
TVWV 1	TVWV 1:1667	Wir haben nicht mit Fleisch und Blut zu kämpfen	3rd Sunday of Lent	SATB with 2 oboes, 2 violins, viola, cello and continuo	—	Telemann Portal; Catalogue TWV
TVWV 1	TVWV 1:1668	Wir liegen, großer Gott, vor dir	22nd Sunday after Trinity	SATB with 2 oboes, 2 bassoons, 2 violins, 2 violas, cello and continuo	—	Telemann Portal; Catalogue TWV
TVWV 1	TVWV 1:1669	Wir müssen alle offenbar werden	9th Sunday after Trinity	SATB with 2 oboes, 2 violins, viola, cello and continuo	—	Telemann Portal; Catalogue TWV
TVWV 1	TVWV 1:1670	Wir müssen alle offenbaret werden	9th Sunday after Trinity	SATB with 2 oboes, 2 violins, viola, cello and continuo	—	Telemann Portal; Catalogue TWV
TVWV 1	TVWV 1:1671	Wir müssen alle offenbar werden	27th Sunday after Trinity	—	—	Telemann Portal; Catalogue TWV
TVWV 1	TVWV 1:1672	Wir müssen alle offenbar werden	26th Sunday after Trinity	SAB with 2 violins, viola and continuo	—	Telemann Portal; Catalogue TWV
TVWV 1	TVWV 1:1673	Wir müssen alle sterben	Feast of the Purification of Mary	—	Lost	Telemann Portal; Catalogue TWV
TVWV 1	TVWV 1:1674	Wir sind allesamt wie die Unreinen	6th Sunday after Trinity	SATB with 2 violins, viola, cello and continuo	—	Telemann Portal; Catalogue TWV
TVWV 1	TVWV 1:1675	Wir sind allesamt wie die Unreinen	20th Sunday after Trinity	SATB with 2 oboes, 2 violins, viola, cello and continuo	—	Telemann Portal; Catalogue TWV
TVWV 1	TVWV 1:1676	Wir sind allzumal Sünder	Septuagesima Sunday	SATB with 2 oboes, 2 violins, viola, cello and continuo	—	Telemann Portal; Catalogue TWV
TVWV 1	TVWV 1:1677	Wir sind Gottes Mitarbeiter	5th Sunday after Epiphany	SATB with 2 oboes, 2 violins, viola, cello and continuo	—	Telemann Portal; Catalogue TWV
TVWV 1	TVWV 1:1678	Wir sollen selig werden und bleiben	Feast of the Trinity	SATB with 2 oboes, 2 violins, 2 violas and continuo	—	Telemann Portal; Catalogue TWV
TVWV 1	TVWV 1:1679	Wirst du den Herrn suchen	1st Sunday after Epiphany	—	Lost	Telemann Portal; Catalogue TWV
TVWV 1	TVWV 1:1680	Wir waren weiland Heiden	Feast of the Epiphany	—	Lost	Telemann Portal; Catalogue TWV
TVWV 1	TVWV 1:1681	Wir wissen, dass denen, die Gott lieben	Sunday After New Year's Eve	SATB with 2 oboes, 2 violins, viola, cello and continuo	—	Telemann Portal; Catalogue TWV
TVWV 1	TVWV 1:1682	Wir wissen, dass denen, die Gott lieben	3rd Sunday after Easter	SAB with 2 violins, viola and continuo	—	Telemann Portal; Catalogue TWV
TVWV 1	TVWV 1:1683	Wir wissen, dass Gott die Sünder nicht höret	Rogation Festival	SATB with 2 oboes, 2 violins, viola, cello and continuo	—	Telemann Portal; Catalogue TWV
TVWV 1	TVWV 1:1684	Wisch' doch den Schlaf aus den Augen	4th Sunday of Advent	—	Lost	Telemann Portal; Catalogue TWV
TVWV 1	TVWV 1:1685	Wisset ihr nicht, dass alle	4th Sunday of Advent	SATB with 2 oboes, 2 bassoons, 2 violins, viola, cello and continuo	—	Telemann Portal; Catalogue TWV
TVWV 1	TVWV 1:1686	Wisset ihr nicht, dass euer Leib	Feast of Pentecost	SAB with 3 trumpets, timpani, 2 violins, viola and continuo	—	Telemann Portal; Catalogue TWV
TVWV 1	TVWV 1:1687	Wisset ihr nicht, dass ihr Gottes Tempel seid?	Feast of Pentecost	SATB with 2 flutes, 2 oboes, 2 violins, viola, cello and continuo	—	Telemann Portal; Catalogue TWV
TVWV 1	TVWV 1:1688	Wisset ihr nicht, dass ihr Gottes Tempel seid?	25th Sunday after Trinity	—	Lost	Telemann Portal; Catalogue TWV
TVWV 1	TVWV 1:1689	Wo bleibt die brüderliche Lieb'	22nd Sunday after Trinity	—	—	Telemann Portal; Catalogue TWV
TVWV 1	TVWV 1:1690	Wo find' ich meinen Jesum wieder	1st Sunday after Epiphany	SATB with 2 oboes, 2 violins, viola, cello and continuo	—	Telemann Portal; Catalogue TWV
TVWV 1	TVWV 1:1691	Wo Gott, der Herr, nicht bei uns hält	Sunday after Ascension Day	—	Lost	Telemann Portal; Catalogue TWV
TVWV 1	TVWV 1:1692	Wohin ich nur die Augen wende	25th Sunday after Trinity	SATB with 2 oboes, 2 violins, viola, cello and continuo	—	Telemann Portal; Catalogue TWV
TVWV 1	TVWV 1:1693	Wohin ich nur die Augen wende	25th Sunday after Trinity	SATB with 2 violins, viola, cello and continuo	—	Telemann Portal; Catalogue TWV
TVWV 1	TVWV 1:1694	Wohlan alle, die ihr durstig sein	2nd Sunday after Trinity	SATB with 2 oboes, 2 violins, viola, cello and continuo concertante	—	Telemann Portal; Catalogue TWV
TVWV 1	TVWV 1:1695	Wohlan alle, die ihr durstig seid	26th Sunday after Trinity	—	= TVWV 2:1a	Telemann Portal; Catalogue TWV
TVWV 1	TVWV 1:1696	Wohlan, ich will meinem Lieben	Septuagesima Sunday	SATB with 2 oboes, 2 violins, viola, cello and continuo	—	Telemann Portal; Catalogue TWV
TVWV 1	TVWV 1:1697	Wohlauf, Herze, sing und spring	24th Sunday after Trinity	Solo viola and SATB with 2 violins, viola and continuo	—	Telemann Portal; Catalogue TWV
TVWV 1	TVWV 1:1698	Wohl dem, dem die Übertretungen	19th Sunday after Trinity	SATB with 2 oboes, 2 violins, viola, cello and continuo	—	Telemann Portal; Catalogue TWV
TVWV 1	TVWV 1:1699	Wohl dem, dem die Übertretungen	22nd Sunday after Trinity	SATB with 2 oboes, 2 violins, viola, cello and continuo	—	Telemann Portal; Catalogue TWV
TVWV 1	TVWV 1:1700	Wohl dem, dem die Übertretungen	19th Sunday after Trinity	—	—	Telemann Portal; Catalogue TWV
TVWV 1	TVWV 1:1701	Wohl dem, dem die Übertretungen	19th Sunday after Trinity	—	—	Telemann Portal; Catalogue TWV
TVWV 1	TVWV 1:1702	Wohl dem, der den Herrn fürchtet	Septuagesima Sunday	—	Lost	Telemann Portal; Catalogue TWV
TVWV 1	TVWV 1:1703	Wohl dem, der den Herrn fürchtet	15th Sunday after Trinity	SATB with 2 oboes, 2 violins, viola, cello and continuo	—	Telemann Portal; Catalogue TWV
TVWV 1	TVWV 1:1704	Wohl dem, der den Herrn fürchtet	4th Sunday after Easter	SATB with 2 violins, viola, cello and continuo	—	Telemann Portal; Catalogue TWV
TVWV 1	TVWV 1:1705	Wohl dem, der in Gelassenheit	3rd Sunday after Epiphany	SATB with 2 oboes, 2 violins, viola, cello and continuo	—	Telemann Portal; Catalogue TWV
TVWV 1	TVWV 1:1706	Wohl dem, der in Gottes Furcht stehet	2nd Sunday after Epiphany	—	Lost	Telemann Portal; Catalogue TWV
TVWV 1	TVWV 1:1707	Wohl dem, der mit Geduld bei schwerer Zeit	25th Sunday after Trinity	SATB with 2 oboes, 2 violins, viola, cello and continuo	—	Telemann Portal; Catalogue TWV
TVWV 1	TVWV 1:1708	Wohl dem, des Hilfe der Gott Jacob ist	3rd Sunday after Epiphany	—	—	Telemann Portal; Catalogue TWV
TVWV 1	TVWV 1:1709	Wohl dem, des Hilfe der Gott Jacobs ist	4th Sunday of Lent	—	—	Telemann Portal; Catalogue TWV
TVWV 1	TVWV 1:1710	Wohl dem Volke, das jauchzen kann	Feast of the Visitation of Mary	SATB with 2 flutes, 2 oboes, 3 horns, 2 violins, viola, cello and continuo	—	Telemann Portal; Catalogue TWV
TVWV 1	TVWV 1:1711	Wohl dir, o Volk, dass du durch	3rd day of the feast of Pentecost	—	Lost	Telemann Portal; Catalogue TWV
TVWV 1	TVWV 1:1712	Wohl her nun und lasset uns wohlleben	3rd Sunday after Easter	—	Lost	Telemann Portal; Catalogue TWV
TVWV 1	TVWV 1:1713	Wohl her nun und lasset uns wohlleben	3rd Sunday after Easter	SATB with 2 oboes, 3 bugles, timpani, 2 violins, viola, cello and continuo	—	Telemann Portal; Catalogue TWV
TVWV 1	TVWV 1:1714	Wo ich gehe, wo ich stehe	Christmas Feast	—	= TVWV 1:1715	Telemann Portal; Catalogue TWV
TVWV 1	TVWV 1:1715	Wo ich gehe, wo ich stehe	Christmas Feast	—	= TVWV 1:1714	Telemann Portal; Catalogue TWV
TVWV 1	TVWV 1:1716	Wo ist dann dein Freund hingegangen	1st Sunday after Epiphany	SATB with 2 oboes, 2 violins, viola, cello and continuo	= TVWV 1:1714	Telemann Portal; Catalogue TWV
TVWV 1	TVWV 1:1717	Wo ist denn mein Jesus hin?	Miscellaneous cantatas	Bass solo with violin and continuo	—	Telemann Portal; Catalogue TWV
TVWV 1	TVWV 1:1718	Wo ist ein solcher Gott, wie du bist?	22nd Sunday after Trinity	—	= TVWV 1:1719	Telemann Portal; Catalogue TWV
TVWV 1	TVWV 1:1719	Wo ist ein solcher Gott, wie du bist?	22nd Sunday after Trinity	SATB with 2 violins, viola, cello and continuo	= TVWV 1:1718	Telemann Portal; Catalogue TWV
TVWV 1	TVWV 1:1720	Wo ist solch ein Gott, wie du bist	3rd Sunday after Trinity	SATB with 2 oboes, 2 violins, viola, cello and continuo	= TVWV 1:1718	Telemann Portal; Catalogue TWV
TVWV 1	TVWV 1:1721	Wo ist solch ein Gott, wie du bist	19th Sunday after Trinity	SAB with 2 violins, viola, cello and continuo	—	Telemann Portal; Catalogue TWV
TVWV 1	TVWV 1:1722	Wo Jesus Hunger merkt	4th Sunday of Lent	SATB with 2 oboes, 2 violins, viola, cello and continuo	—	Telemann Portal; Catalogue TWV
TVWV 1	TVWV 1:1722a	Wolken regnen, Berge geb	9th Sunday after Trinity	Solo voice with violin, viola and continuo	Version	Catalogue TWV
TVWV 1	TVWV 1:1722b	Wolken, ward ihr leer von Blitzen	Passion Sunday	Solo voice with violin, viola and continuo	Version	Catalogue TWV
TVWV 1	TVWV 1:1723	Wollüstiger Sinnen bemühtes Beginnen	3rd Sunday of Advent	SATB with 2 flutes/oboe, 2 violins, viola, cello and continuo	—	Telemann Portal; Catalogue TWV
TVWV 1	TVWV 1:1724	Wo soll ich fliehen hin	22nd Sunday after Trinity	Solo bass and SATB with flute, 2 oboes, bassoon, 2 violins, viola and continuo	—	Telemann Portal; Catalogue TWV
TVWV 1	TVWV 1:1725	Wo soll ich fliehen hin	Miscellaneous cantatas	Soprano solo with 2 violins and continuo	—	Telemann Portal; Catalogue TWV
TVWV 1	TVWV 1:1726	Wünschet Jerusalem Glück	New Year	SATB with 2 oboes, 2 hunting horns, 2 violins, viola, cello and continuo	—	Telemann Portal; Catalogue TWV
TVWV 1	TVWV 1:1727	Wünschet Jerusalem Glück	New Year	SATB with 2 oboes, bassoon, 2 trumpets, timpani, 2 violins, viola, cello and continuo	—	Telemann Portal; Catalogue TWV
TVWV 1	TVWV 1:1727a	Zerbrechliche Gefasse	4th Sunday after Trinity	Solo voice with violin, viola and continuo	Version	Catalogue TWV
TVWV 1	TVWV 1:1727b	Zerknirsche, du mein blodes	3rd Sunday after Trinity	Solo voice with flute, violin and continuo	Version	Catalogue TWV
TVWV 1	TVWV 1:1728	Zeuch, ohn Verzug, in deinen Nöten	Rogation Festival	SATB with 2 oboes, 2 violins, viola, cello and continuo	—	Telemann Portal; Catalogue TWV
TVWV 1	TVWV 1:1729	Ziehet euch Kinder auf	1st Sunday after Epiphany	—	Lost	Telemann Portal; Catalogue TWV
TVWV 1	TVWV 1:1730	Zions Hülf und Abrams Lohn	New Year	SATB with oboe, horn, 2 violins, viola, cello and continuo	—	Telemann Portal; Catalogue TWV
TVWV 1	TVWV 1:1731	Zion spricht: Der Herr hat mich verlassen	3rd Sunday after Easter	SATB with 2 oboes, 2 violins, viola, cello and continuo	—	Telemann Portal; Catalogue TWV
TVWV 1	TVWV 1:1732	Zischet nur, stechet, ihr feurigen Zungen	Feast of Pentecost	Solo voice with oboe and continuo	—	Telemann Portal; Catalogue TWV
TVWV 1	TVWV 1:1733	Zorn und Wüten sind Greuel	6th Sunday after Trinity	SATB with flute, 2 oboes, 2 violins, 2 violas and continuo	= TVWV 1:1734	Telemann Portal; Catalogue TWV
TVWV 1	TVWV 1:1734	Zorn und Wüten sind Greuel	6th Sunday after Trinity	SATB with 2 violins, viola, cello and continuo	= TVWV 1:1733	Telemann Portal; Catalogue TWV
TVWV 1	TVWV 1:1735	Zu dir flieh ich, verstoß mich nicht	11th Sunday after Trinity	Solo soprano and SATB with 2 violins, viola and continuo	—	Telemann Portal; Catalogue TWV
TVWV 1	TVWV 1:1735a	Zurne nur, du alte Schlange	Easter	Solo voice with oboe/trombone, violin and continuo	Version	Catalogue TWV
TVWV 1	TVWV 1:1736	Zu Mitternacht ward ein Geschrei	20th Sunday after Trinity	SATB with 2 oboes, 2 violins, viola, cello and continuo	—	Telemann Portal; Catalogue TWV
TVWV 1	TVWV 1:1737	Zuvor bracht ich euch Freude	3rd Sunday after Easter	SATB with 2 flutes, 2 horns, 3 bugles, timpani, 2 violins, viola, cello and continuo	—	Telemann Portal; Catalogue TWV
TVWV 1	TVWV 1:1738	Zween Jünger gehn nach Emmaus	2nd day of Easter	SATB with 2 flutes, 2 oboes, 2 violins, viola, cello and continuo	—	Telemann Portal; Catalogue TWV
TVWV 1	TVWV 1:1739	Zwei Menschen, welche Saba hat geboren	Feast of the Epiphany	—	Lost	Telemann Portal; Catalogue TWV
TVWV 1	TVWV 1:1740	Aussatz hat mich ganz gefressen	3rd Sunday after Epiphany	SATB with 2 violins, viola, cello and continuo	—	Telemann Portal; Catalogue TWV
TVWV 1	TVWV 1:1741	Dies ist der Tag, den der Herr gemacht hat	Miscellaneous cantatas	Solo tenor with violin, bassoon and continuo	—	Telemann Portal; Catalogue TWV
TVWV 1	TVWV 1:1742	Es wird ein Stern aus Jacob	Feast of the Epiphany	—	Lost	Telemann Portal; Catalogue TWV
TVWV 1	TVWV 1:1743	Selig sind, die zum Abendmahl des Lammes berufen sind	Miscellaneous cantatas	Soprano and Tenor solo with 2 violins, viola and continuo	—	Telemann Portal; Catalogue TWV
TVWV 1	TVWV 1:1744	So gehst du nun, mein Jesu, hin	Miscellaneous cantatas	SATTB with 2 oboes d'amore, 2 violins, viola and continuo	—	Telemann Portal; Catalogue TWV
TVWV 1	TVWV 1:1745	Unbegreiflich ist dein Wesen	Feast of the Trinity	Solo voice with violin, viola and continuo	—	Telemann Portal; Catalogue TWV
TVWV 1	TVWV 1:1746	Victoria, mein Jesus ist erstanden	Easter	Solo bass with bugle, violin, viola and continuo	—	Telemann Portal; Catalogue TWV
TVWV 1	TVWV 1:1747	Was Gott tut, ist wohlgetan	Miscellaneous cantatas	Soprano and Bass Solo with violin and continuo	—	Telemann Portal; Catalogue TWV
TVWV 1	TVWV 1:1748	Singet dem Herrn ein neues Lied	New Year	SATB with 2 trumpets, timpani, 2 harps, 2 violins, viola and continuo	—	Telemann Portal; Catalogue TWV
TVWV 1	TVWV 1:1749	Da ich mich hier eingefunden	Feast of the Purification of Mary	—	Lost	Telemann Portal; Catalogue TWV
TVWV 1	TVWV 1:1750	Dein Schade ist verzweifelt böse	5th Sunday after Trinity	—	Lost	Telemann Portal; Catalogue TWV
TVWV 1	TVWV 1:1751	Der Segen des Herrn machet reich	—	—	—	Telemann Portal; Catalogue TWV
TVWV 1	TVWV 1:1752	Gott ist die Liebe	—	—	—	Telemann Portal; Catalogue TWV
TVWV 1	TVWV 1:1753	Es ist umsonst, dass ihr früh aufstehet	—	—	—	Telemann Portal; Catalogue TWV
TVWV 1	TVWV 1:1754	Meine Seele erhebt den Herrn	—	—	—	Telemann Portal; Catalogue TWV

=== TVWV 2 – Cantatas for consecrations ===
Section	Catalogue	Title	Occasion	Scoring	Observation	URL
TVWV 2	TVWV 2:1	Wohlan alle, die ihr durstig seid	20th Sunday after Trinidad [Hamm und Horn]	SATB with recorder, flute, oboe, 2 violins, viola, cello and continuo	—	Telemann Portal; Catalogue TWV
TVWV 2	TVWV 2:2	Herr, ich habe lieb die Statte deines Hausses	Cantata probably dedicated to the consecration of a church	SATB with 2 violins, viola, cello and continuo	—	Telemann Portal; Catalogue TWV
TVWV 2	TVWV 2:3	Siehe da, eine Huttel Gottes	Consecration of the church of St. Nicholas in Billwerder	SATB with oboe, 3 bugles, timpani, 2 violins, viola, cello and continuo	—	Telemann Portal; Catalogue TWV
TVWV 2	TVWV 2:4	Ich halte mich zu deinem Altar	Consecration of the altar of St. Gertrude's Church in Hamburg	SATB with 3 bugles, timpani, 2 violins, viola, cello and continuo	—	Telemann Portal; Catalogue TWV
TVWV 2	TVWV 2:5	Komm, lasset uns anbeten	Consecration of the church of St. Job's Hospital in Hamburg	SATB with flute, oboe, 2 violins, viola, cello and continuo	—	Telemann Portal; Catalogue TWV
TVWV 2	TVWV 2:6	Heilig, heilig ist Gott	Consecration of St. George's Church in Hamburg	SATB with 2 oboes, 3 bugles, timpani, 2 violins, viola, cello and continuo	—	Telemann Portal; Catalogue TWV
TVWV 2	TVWV 2:7	Zerschmettert die Gotzen	Consecration of a church in a new city	SATB with flute, oboe, 2 bugles, timpani, 2 violins, (viola), cello and continuo	—	Telemann Portal; Catalogue TWV
TVWV 2	TVWV 2:8	(Musik zur Grundsteinlegung Hamburg, St. Michaeliskirche)	Cornerstone of the new St. Michael's Church in Hamburg laid	—	Lost	Telemann Portal; Catalogue TWV
TVWV 2	TVWV 2:9	Singet Gott, lob singet seinem Namen	Consecration of the church of Rellingen	SATB with 2 flutes, 2 bugles, 2 horns, timpani, 2 violins, viola, cello and continuo	—	Telemann Portal; Catalogue TWV
TVWV 2	TVWV 2:10	Ich will die zerfallene Hutte Davids	Consecration of the small St. Michael's Church in Hamburg	—	Lost	Telemann Portal; Catalogue TWV
TVWV 2	TVWV 2:11	Wie lieblich sind seine Wohnungen	Church Consecration	AB solo, SATB with 2 oboes, bassoon, 2 violins, viola, cello and continuo	—	Telemann Portal; Catalogue TWV
TVWV 2	TVWV 2:12	Komm wieder, Herr, zu der Menge der Tausenden in Israel	Consecration of the great St. Michael's Church in Hamburg	SATB with 2 oboes; 2 choirs with 2 bugles, 2 horns, timpani, 2 violins, viola, cello and continuo	—	Telemann Portal; Catalogue TWV
TVWV 2	TVWV 2:13	Wie liechlich sind doch deine Wohnungen	Cantata for a consecration	SATB with flute, 2 oboes, oboe d'amore, bassoon, 2 bugles, timpani, 2 violins, viola, cello and continuo	—	Telemann Portal; Catalogue TWV

=== TVWV 3 – Cantatas for the ordination of preachers ===
Section	Catalogue	Title	Occasion	Scoring	Observation	URL
TVWV 3	TVWV 3:0	Veni, sancte spiritus	—	—	—	Telemann Portal; Catalogue TWV
TVWV 3	TVWV 3:1	Ein jeder, wie ihn der Herr berufen / Veni sancte spiritus / Dazu ist erschienen der Sohn Gottes	Preacher H. Hartwig Bambinus	—	Not Preserved	Telemann Portal; Catalogue TWV
TVWV 3	TVWV 3:2	Der Herr ist mein Hirte / Veni sancte spiritus / Dein Wort ist meinem Munde suss	Preacher Nicolaus Busch	—	Not Preserved	Telemann Portal; Catalogue TWV
TVWV 3	TVWV 3:3	Gleichwie der Regen und Schnee / Veni sancte spiritus / Selig sind, die Gottes Wort	Preacher Franz Hartlieb Schonemann	—	Not Preserved	Telemann Portal; Catalogue TWV
TVWV 3	TVWV 3:4	Selig sind, die Gottes Wort / Veni sancte spiritus / Tritt Arbeit und Beruf	Preacher Ericus Matthias Schmidt	—	Not Preserved	Telemann Portal; Catalogue TWV
TVWV 3	TVWV 3:5	Seid stark in dem Herrn / Komm heiliger Geist / Meine Schafe horen meine Stimme	Preacher Bernhard Raupach	—	Not Preserved	Telemann Portal; Catalogue TWV
TVWV 3	TVWV 3:6	Machet keusch eure Seelen / Komm heiliger Geist / Wer mich liebet, der wird	Preacher Ludwig Samuel Siegmann	—	Not Preserved	Telemann Portal; Catalogue TWV
TVWV 3	TVWV 3:7	Selig sind, die Gottes Wort / Veni sancte spiritus / Dein Wort ist meinem Munde susse	Preacher M. Arnoldus Greve	—	Not Preserved	Telemann Portal; Catalogue TWV
TVWV 3	TVWV 3:8	In Jesu kann ich mich erquicken / Komm heiliger Geist / Der Herr ist mein Hirte	Preacher Jacob Walter Steen	—	Not Preserved	Telemann Portal; Catalogue TWV
TVWV 3	TVWV 3:9	Der Herr ist mein getreuer Hirte / Veni sancte spiritus / So jemand Christi Wort wird halten	Preacher Johann George Pula	—	Not Preserved	Telemann Portal; Catalogue TWV
TVWV 3	TVWV 3:10	Es danken dir Gott die Volker / Komm heiliger Geist / Schaffe in mir Gott ein reines Herz	Preacher Johann Baptista Tecklenburg	—	Not Preserved	Telemann Portal; Catalogue TWV
TVWV 3	TVWV 3:11	Wie lieblich sind deine Wohnungen / Veni sancte spiritus / Der Herr gibt das Wort mit grossen Schaaren	Preacher Georg Schaar	—	Lost	Telemann Portal; Catalogue TWV
TVWV 3	TVWV 3:12	Gott gross uber alle Gotter / Komm heiliger Geist / Schau Herr, ein junger Lehrer	Preacher Tobias Henrich Schubart	—	Lost	Telemann Portal; Catalogue TWV
TVWV 3	TVWV 3:13	In Jesu kann ich mich erquicken / Veni sancte spiritus / Heilige sie, Vater, in deiner Wahrheit	Preacher Daniel Rucker	—	Not Preserved	Telemann Portal; Catalogue TWV
TVWV 3	TVWV 3:14	Kinder, es ist die letzte Stunde / Komm heiliger Geist / Wie teuer ist deine Gute	Preacher Heinrich Hock	—	Not Preserved	Telemann Portal; Catalogue TWV
TVWV 3	TVWV 3:15	Der Herr ist mein Hirte / Veni sancte spiritus / Herr Jesu Christ dich zu uns wend	Preacher Heinrich Koch	—	Not Preserved	Telemann Portal; Catalogue TWV
TVWV 3	TVWV 3:16	Es danken dir Gott die Volker / Komm heiliger Geist / In Jesu kann ich mich erquicken	Preacher? Meyer	—	Not Preserved	Telemann Portal; Catalogue TWV
TVWV 3	TVWV 3:17	Hilf Herr, die Heiligen haben / Komm heiliger Geist / Auf! Reiniget das Feld	Preacher Philipp Ludolph Scribe	—	Not Preserved	Telemann Portal; Catalogue TWV
TVWV 3	TVWV 3:18	(Predigereinführungsmusik Büsch, Paul Christoph (Hamburg, St. Michaelis))	Preacher Paul Christoph Busch	—	Lost	Telemann Portal; Catalogue TWV
TVWV 3	TVWV 3:19	Dein Wort lass mich bekennen / Veni sancte spiritus / Amen, Lob und Ehre	Preacher Johnn Albert Wilde	—	Lost	Telemann Portal; Catalogue TWV
TVWV 3	TVWV 3:20	Fer feste Grund Gottes bestehet / Veni sancte spiritus / So lasset uns nun opfern	Preacher Adolph Wilhelm von Gohren	—	Lost	Telemann Portal; Catalogue TWV
TVWV 3	TVWV 3:21	(Predigereinführungsmusik Richter, Johann Gottfried (Hamburg, St. Catharinen))	Preacher Johann Gottfried Richter	—	Lost	Telemann Portal; Catalogue TWV
TVWV 3	TVWV 3:22	Es danken dir Gott die Volker / Komm heiliger Geist / Ware Gott nicht mit uns diese Zeit	Preacher Johannes Albertus Elers	—	Not Preserved	Telemann Portal; Catalogue TWV
TVWV 3	TVWV 3:23	(Predigereinführungsmusik Schlosser, Johann Ludwig (Hamburg, St. Catharinen))	Preacher Johann Ludwig Schlosser	—	Lost	Telemann Portal; Catalogue TWV
TVWV 3	TVWV 3:24	(Predigereinführungsmusik Wagner, D. Th. Friedrich (Hamburg, St. Michaelis))	Preacher Friedrich Wagner	—	Lost	Telemann Portal; Catalogue TWV
TVWV 3	TVWV 3:25	(Predigereinführungsmusik Müller, Christian Heinrich (Hamburg, St. Georg))	Preacher Christian Heinrich Muller	—	Lost	Telemann Portal; Catalogue TWV
TVWV 3	TVWV 3:26	Gott gross uber alle Gotter / Komm heiliger Geist / Gottes Wort, was ist das vor ein	Preacher Johann Adolph Gronau	—	Not Preserved	Telemann Portal; Catalogue TWV
TVWV 3	TVWV 3:27	(Predigereinführungsmusik Greissmar, Johann Andreas (Billwerder))	Preacher Johann Andreas Geissmer	—	Lost	Telemann Portal; Catalogue TWV
TVWV 3	TVWV 3:28	(Predigereinführungsmusik Greve, Arnold (Hamburg, St. Catharinen))	Preacher Arnold Greve	—	Lost	Telemann Portal; Catalogue TWV
TVWV 3	TVWV 3:29	Die das Wort der Wahrheit lehren / Veni sancte spiritus / Machet keusch eure Seelen	Preacher Johann Conrad Klefeker	—	Lost	Telemann Portal; Catalogue TWV
TVWV 3	TVWV 3:30	Fuhre mich, o Herr, und leite meinen Hang / Komm heiliger Geist / Wie wollen wie, wie Schwache, fahren	Preacher Nicolaus Alardus	—	Lost	Telemann Portal; Catalogue TWV
TVWV 3	TVWV 3:31	Ich weiss, an welchen ich glaube / Veni sancte spiritus / Nun ich weiss, worauf ich baue	Preacher Christoph Henschen	—	Lost	Telemann Portal; Catalogue TWV
TVWV 3	TVWV 3:32	(Predigereinführungsmusik Feige, Michael Gerhard (Hamm und Horn))	Preacher Michael Gerhard Feige	—	Lost	Telemann Portal; Catalogue TWV
TVWV 3	TVWV 3:33	Die Lehrer werden leuchten wie des Himmels Glanz / Veni sancte spiritus / Gott der Herr ist Sonn und Schild	Preacher Erdmann Gottlieb Neumeister	—	= TVWV 3:43	Telemann Portal; Catalogue TWV
TVWV 3	TVWV 3:34	Wie lieblich sind deine Wohnungen / Komm heiliger Geist / Herr Zebaoth, mein Konig, mein Gott	Preacher Herrmann Christ	—	Lost	Telemann Portal; Catalogue TWV
TVWV 3	TVWV 3:35	Wo will man Weisheit finden / Veni sancte spiritus / Ja dies nur, dies alleine	Preacher Johann Ludwig Schlosser	—	Not Preserved	Telemann Portal; Catalogue TWV
TVWV 3	TVWV 3:36	(Predigereinführungsmusik Krüsicke, Johann Christoph (Hamburg, St. Petri))	Preacher Johann Christoph Krusicke	—	Lost	Telemann Portal; Catalogue TWV
TVWV 3	TVWV 3:37	Schaffet, dass ihr selig werdet / Veni sancte spiritus / Dinet dem Herrn mit Freuden / Ihr an geweihtem Ort gesprochnen Segensworte	Preacher Joachim Daniel Zimmermann	—	Lost	Telemann Portal; Catalogue TWV
TVWV 3	TVWV 3:38	(Predigereinführungsmusik Heise, Carl Johann (Hamburg, St. Petri))	Preacher Carl Johann Heise	—	Lost	Telemann Portal; Catalogue TWV
TVWV 3	TVWV 3:39	Selig sind, die Gottes Wort / Veni sancte spiritus / So legst ab alle Unsauberkeit	Preacher Johann Arnold Schrotteringh	—	Not Preserved	Telemann Portal; Catalogue TWV
TVWV 3	TVWV 3:40	(Predigereinführungsmusik Nölting, Johann Andreas (Hamburg, St. Michaelis))	Preacher Johann Andreas Nolting	—	Lost	Telemann Portal; Catalogue TWV
TVWV 3	TVWV 3:41	Alle Schrift, von Gott sinegeben / Veni sancte spiritus / Wie? Sollte Jesus von mir gehen	Preacher Mathias Luttmann	—	Lost	Telemann Portal; Catalogue TWV
TVWV 3	TVWV 3:42	(Predigereinführungsmusik Mylius, Ernst Friedrich)	Preacher Ernst Friedrich Mylis	—	Lost	Telemann Portal; Catalogue TWV
TVWV 3	TVWV 3:43	(Predigereinführungsmusik Neumeister, Erdmann Gottlieb (Hamburg, St. Jacobi))	Preacher Erdmann Gottlieb Neumeister	—	= TVWV 3:33	Telemann Portal; Catalogue TWV
TVWV 3	TVWV 3:44	(Predigereinführungsmusik Neumeister, Erdmann Gottwert (Hamburg, St. Jacobi))	Preacher Erdmann Gottwert Neumeister	—	Lost	Telemann Portal; Catalogue TWV
TVWV 3	TVWV 3:45	O Jerusalem, ich will Wachter / Veni sancte spiritus / Du Menschenkind, ich habe dich / Amen, Lob und Ehre und Weisheit	Preacher Ernst Friedrich Mylius	—	Not Preserved	Telemann Portal; Catalogue TWV
TVWV 3	TVWV 3:46	(Predigereinführungsmusik Werkmeister, Georg Anton (Hamburg, St. Petri))	Preacher George Anton Werkmeister	—	Lost	Telemann Portal; Catalogue TWV
TVWV 3	TVWV 3:47	Gehe aus deinem Vaterland und aus / Veni sancte spiritus / Lass dir an meiner Gnade genugen / Die Erlosten des Herrn werden wiederkommen	Preacher Christoph Friedrich Schaub	—	Lost	Telemann Portal; Catalogue TWV
TVWV 3	TVWV 3:48	Der Herr segne dich / Veni sancte spiritus / Der Herr is mein Hirte	Preacher Hinrich Wordenhoff	—	Not Preserved	Telemann Portal; Catalogue TWV
TVWV 3	TVWV 3:49	Wo will man Weisheit finden / Veni sancte spiritus / Ja dies, nur dies allein	Preacher Alexander Joachim Johann Schroder	—	Lost	Telemann Portal; Catalogue TWV
TVWV 3	TVWV 3:50	Wohl durch Brockes als Landesherren	Preacher Schulze	—	Lost	Telemann Portal; Catalogue TWV
TVWV 3	TVWV 3:51	(Predigereinführungsmusik Küster, Johann Erich (Groden))	Preacher Johann Erich Kuster	—	Lost	Telemann Portal; Catalogue TWV
TVWV 3	TVWV 3:52	(Musik zum 50. Predigerjubiläum Neumeister, Erdmann)	Feast of the 50th anniversary of the priesthood of Erdmann Neumeister	—	Lost	Telemann Portal; Catalogue TWV
TVWV 3	TVWV 3:53	Alle Schrift von Gott singegeben / Komm heiliger Geist / Hilf Jesu, da ich liebe	Preacher? Gericke	—	Lost	Telemann Portal; Catalogue TWV
TVWV 3	TVWV 3:54	Hebet eure Hande auf im Heiligtum / Komm heiliger Geist / Danket dem Herrn und prediget / Ich scheue nichts, der Herr hort	Preacher Georg Ehrenfried Paul Raupach	—	Lost	Telemann Portal; Catalogue TWV
TVWV 3	TVWV 3:55	Seid nuchtern und wachet / Veni sancte spiritus / Fuhre mich, o Herr, und leite mich	Preacher Christoph Hofer	—	Lost	Telemann Portal; Catalogue TWV
TVWV 3	TVWV 3:56	Herr, lehre mich tun nach deinem Wohlgefallen / Veni sancte spiritus / So sind wir nun Botschafter	Preacher Samuel Seeland	—	Partially Lost	Telemann Portal; Catalogue TWV
TVWV 3	TVWV 3:56a	So sind wir nun Botschafter an Christi statt	—	SATB with 2 violins, viola, cello and continuo	—	Catalogue TWV
TVWV 3	TVWV 3:57	Alles was Odem hat lobe den Herrn / Veni sancte spiritus / Wohl dem, den du erwahlet	Preacher Anton Kuhn	—	Partially Lost	Telemann Portal; Catalogue TWV
TVWV 3	TVWV 3:57a	Alles, was Odem hat, lobe den Herrn	—	SATB	—	Catalogue TWV
TVWV 3	TVWV 3:58	So lasset uns nun nicht schlafen / Veni sancte spiritus / Seid nuchtern und wachet	Preacher Georg Heinrich Schulze	—	Lost	Telemann Portal; Catalogue TWV
TVWV 3	TVWV 3:59	O Jerusalem, ich will Wachter / Veni sancte spiritus / Du Menschenkind, ich habe dich	Preacher Bernhard Nicolaus Harz	—	Lost	Telemann Portal; Catalogue TWV
TVWV 3	TVWV 3:60	Wo will man Weisheit finden / Veni sancte spiritus / Ja dies, nur dies allein	Preacher Tobias Zornickel	—	Lost	Telemann Portal; Catalogue TWV
TVWV 3	TVWV 3:61	Habe acht auf dich selbst und auf / Komm heiliger Geist / Wie lieblich sind auf den Bergen	Preacher Joachim Lutkens	—	Partially Lost	Telemann Portal; Catalogue TWV
TVWV 3	TVWV 3:61a	Wie lieblich sind auf den Bergen	—	SATB with 2 oboes, 3 bugles, timpani, 2 violins, viola, cello and continuo	—	Catalogue TWV
TVWV 3	TVWV 3:62	O Jerusalem, ich will Wachter / Veni sancte spiritus / Du Menschenkind ich habe Wachter gesetzet / Amen, Lob und Ehre und Weisheit	Preacher Julius Gustav Alberti	—	Lost	Telemann Portal; Catalogue TWV
TVWV 3	TVWV 3:63	Liebster Jesu, wir sind hier / Veni sancte spiritus / Der Herr denket an uns	Preacher Johann Melchior Goeze	—	Not Preserved	Telemann Portal; Catalogue TWV
TVWV 3	TVWV 3:64	(Predigereinführungsmusik Evers, Daniel Conrad Heinrich (Hamburg, St. Michaeliis))	Preacher Daniel Conrad Heinrich Evers	—	Lost	Telemann Portal; Catalogue TWV
TVWV 3	TVWV 3:65	Opfre Gott Dank und bezahle / Veni sancte spiritus / Lobet unsern Gott, alle seine Knechte	Preacher Johann Gerhard Sucksdorf	—	Lost	Telemann Portal; Catalogue TWV
TVWV 3	TVWV 3:66	(Predigereinführungsmusik Ulber, Christian Samuel (Hamburg, St. Jacobi))	Preacher Christian Samuel Ulber	—	Lost	Telemann Portal; Catalogue TWV
TVWV 3	TVWV 3:67	Nimme Dank und Weisheit	Preacher Christoph Gottlob Baumgarten	SAB with 2 oboes, 2 violins, viola, cello and continuo	—	Telemann Portal; Catalogue TWV
TVWV 3	TVWV 3:68	Traufelt ihr Himmel von oben / Veni sancte spiritus / Hilf deinem Volk	Preacher Johann Dietrich Winckler	—	Not Preserved	Telemann Portal; Catalogue TWV
TVWV 3	TVWV 3:69	(Predigereinführungsmusik Schwartz, Johann Dieterich (Groden))	Preacher Johann Dietrich Schwartz	—	Lost	Telemann Portal; Catalogue TWV
TVWV 3	TVWV 3:70	Wo will man weisheit / Veni sancte spiritus / So traufelt, ihr Himmel	Preacher Christian Adolf Fiebing	—	Lost	Telemann Portal; Catalogue TWV
TVWV 3	TVWV 3:71	(Predigereinführungsmusik Hintze, Hieronimus (Hamm und Horn))	Preacher Hieronimus Hintze	—	Lost	Telemann Portal; Catalogue TWV
TVWV 3	TVWV 3:72	(Predigereinführungsmusik Bramayer, Peter (Billwerder))	Preacher Peter Brameyer	—	Lost	Telemann Portal; Catalogue TWV
TVWV 3	TVWV 3:73	Schaffet, dass ihr selig werdet / Komm heiliger Geist / Dienst dem Herrn mit Freuden / Ihr an geweihtem Orte	Preacher Friedrich August Selle	—	Lost	Telemann Portal; Catalogue TWV
TVWV 3	TVWV 3:74	Wunsche wohlerkohrner Lehrer / Veni sancte spiritus / Der Herr behute dich	Preacher Bertold Nicolaus Krohn	—	Not Preserved	Telemann Portal; Catalogue TWV
TVWV 3	TVWV 3:75	(Predigereinführungsmusik Orlich, Ernst Ludwig (Hamburg, St. Michaelis))	Preacher Ernst Ludwig Orlich	—	Lost	Telemann Portal; Catalogue TWV
TVWV 3	TVWV 3:76	(Predigereinführungsmusik Hasse, Constantin Detlef (Hamburg, St. Jacobi))	Preacher Constantin Detlef Hasse	—	Lost	Telemann Portal; Catalogue TWV
TVWV 3	TVWV 3:77	Der Herr behute dich / Veni sancte spiritus / Die heilige Freude, an eines Lehrers Hand / Der Herr, der Gott der Treue	Preacher Rutger Hopfer	—	Lost	Telemann Portal; Catalogue TWV
TVWV 3	TVWV 3:78	Des Priesters Lippen sollen / Veni sancte spiritus / Wie lieblich sind auf den Bergen / Lehrer werden leuchten	Preacher Johann Heinrich Daniel Holdenhauer	—	Not Preserved	Telemann Portal; Catalogue TWV
TVWV 3	TVWV 3:79	Erscheine Gott der Ehre / Veni sancte spiritus / Gottes Wort und Luthers Lehr / Durchdring die Welt, du Jesu CHristi Lehr	Preacher Georg Ludwig Herrnschmid	—	Lost	Telemann Portal; Catalogue TWV
TVWV 3	TVWV 3:80	(Predigereinführungsmusik Schlosser, Johann Ludwig (Amt Bergedorf))	Preacher Johann Ludwig Schlosser	—	Lost	Telemann Portal; Catalogue TWV
TVWV 3	TVWV 3:81	(Predigereinführungsmusik Wagner, Friedrich Gottlieb (Hamburg, St. Pauli))	Preacher Friedrich Gottlieb Wagner	—	Lost	Telemann Portal; Catalogue TWV
TVWV 3	TVWV 3:82	Veni, sancte spiritus	—	B solo and SATB with 2 oboes, 2 violins, viola, cello and continuo	—	Telemann Portal; Catalogue TWV
TVWV 3	TVWV 3:83	Veni, sancte spiritus	—	B solo and SATB with 2 violins, viola, cello and continuo	—	Telemann Portal; Catalogue TWV
TVWV 3	TVWV 3:84	Veni, sancte spiritus	—	SATB with 3 bugles, timpani and continuo	—	Telemann Portal; Catalogue TWV
TVWV 3	TVWV 3:85	Veni, sancte spiritus	—	SB solo with continuo	—	Telemann Portal; Catalogue TWV
TVWV 3	TVWV 3:86	Veni, sancte spiritus	—	S solo and SATB with 3 bugles, timpani, 2 violins, viola, cello and continuo	—	Telemann Portal; Catalogue TWV
TVWV 3	TVWV 3:87	Veni, sancte spiritus	—	SATB with continuo	—	Telemann Portal; Catalogue TWV
TVWV 3	TVWV 3:88	Veni, sancte spiritus	—	SSB with continuo	—	Telemann Portal; Catalogue TWV
TVWV 3	TVWV 3:89	Veni, sancte spiritus	—	SSS with continuo	—	Telemann Portal; Catalogue TWV
TVWV 3	TVWV 3:90	Veni, sancte spiritus	—	SATB with 2 oboes, 2 bugles, timpani, 2 violins, viola, cello and continuo	—	Telemann Portal; Catalogue TWV
TVWV 3	TVWV 3:91	Veni, sancte spiritus	—	SATB, SATB	—	Telemann Portal; Catalogue TWV
TVWV 3	TVWV 3:92	Komm heiliger Geist, erfulle die Herzen	—	SSB with 2 violins, viola, cello and continuo	—	Telemann Portal; Catalogue TWV
TVWV 3	TVWV 3:93	Komm heiliger Geist	—	SATB with 3 bugles, timpani, 2 violins, viola, cello and continuo	—	Telemann Portal; Catalogue TWV
TVWV 3	TVWV 3:94	Komm heiliger Geist, erfulle die Herzen	—	B solo and SATB with 2 violins, viola, cello and continuo	—	Telemann Portal; Catalogue TWV
TVWV 3	TVWV 3:95	Wahrheit und das Licht	—	SATB with 2 oboes, 2 violins, viola, cello and continuo	Fragment	Telemann Portal; Catalogue TWV

=== TVWV 4 – Cantatas for funerals ===
Section	Catalogue	Title	Occasion	Scoring	Observation	URL
TVWV 4	TVWV 4:1	Selig sind die Toten	Funeral of Mayor Ludwig Becceler	SATB with 2 violins, viola, cello and continuo	—	Telemann Portal; Catalogue TWV
TVWV 4	TVWV 4:2	Ach wie nichtig, ach wie sluchtig	Funeral of Mayor Gerhard Schröder	SATB with 2 flutes, 2 oboes, 3 bugles, timpani, 2 violins, viola, cello and continuo	—	Telemann Portal; Catalogue TWV
TVWV 4	TVWV 4:3	Das Leben ist ein Rauch, ein Schaum	Funeral of Mayor Heinrich Dietrich Wiese	SATB with flute, oboe, 3 bugles, timpani, 2 violins, viola, cello and continuo	—	Telemann Portal; Catalogue TWV
TVWV 4	TVWV 4:4	Selig sind die Toten	Funeral of parishioner's wife Anna Maria Elers	—	Composition Not Verifiable	Telemann Portal; Catalogue TWV
TVWV 4	TVWV 4:5	Ich hab, gottlob, das mein vollbracht	Funeral for Mayor Hans Jacob Faber	SATB with 3 bugles, timpani, 2 violins, viola, cello and continuo	—	Telemann Portal; Catalogue TWV
TVWV 4	TVWV 4:6	Ach wie nichtig, ach wir fluchtig	Funeral of Mayor Hartlieb Sillem	SATB with flute, oboe, 3 bugles, timpani, 2 violins, viola, cello and continuo	—	Telemann Portal; Catalogue TWV
TVWV 4	TVWV 4:7	In dunkler Nacht, bestruzst und bange	Death of Friedrich August II, King of Poland	SATB with 2 flutes, 2 piccolos, 2 oboes, oboe d'amore, chalumeau; 2 choirs with 3 trumpets, timpani, 2 hunting horns, 2 bassoons, 2 violins, viola, harpsichord and continuo	—	Telemann Portal; Catalogue TWV
TVWV 4	TVWV 4:8	Drange dich an diese Bahre	Funeral of Mayor Daniel Stockfleth	SATB with pastoral flute, 2 oboes, 3 bugles, timpani, 2 violins, viola, cello and continuo	—	Telemann Portal; Catalogue TWV
TVWV 4	TVWV 4:9	Wir haben hier, kleine bleibende Statt	Burial of Pastor Andreas Elers in Hamm und Horn	SATB with 2 flutes, bassoon, 2 violins, viola, cello and continuo	—	Telemann Portal; Catalogue TWV
TVWV 4	TVWV 4:10	Gonne jammervollen Klagen	Funeral of King Carl VI	—	Lost	Telemann Portal; Catalogue TWV
TVWV 4	TVWV 4:11	Gott, du hast deinem Volks ein hartes erzeiget	Funeral of Mayor Johann Hermann Luis	—	Lost	Telemann Portal; Catalogue TWV
TVWV 4	TVWV 4:12	Wer Gott vertraut, hat wohl gebaut	Funeral of Mayor Rutger Ruland	—	Lost	Telemann Portal; Catalogue TWV
TVWV 4	TVWV 4:13	Ich hoffete aufs Licht	Funeral of King Carl VII	SATB with 2 bugles, timpani, 2 violins, viola, cello and continuo	—	Telemann Portal; Catalogue TWV
TVWV 4	TVWV 4:14	Der Mensch ist in seinem Leben wie Gras	Funeral of Mayor Nicolai Stampeel	—	Lost	Telemann Portal; Catalogue TWV
TVWV 4	TVWV 4:15	Lieber Konig, du bist tot	—	solo bass with 2 bugles, 2 violins, viola, cello and continuo	—	Telemann Portal; Catalogue TWV
TVWV 4	TVWV 4:16	Wie ist der Held gefallen	Funeral of King Franz I	—	Lost	Telemann Portal; Catalogue TWV
TVWV 4	TVWV 4:17	Du aber Daniel, gehe hin	—	SATB with recorder, oboe, 2 violins, viola, 2 violas da gamba, cello and continuo	—	Telemann Portal; Catalogue TWV
TVWV 4	TVWV 4:18	Ein Mensch ist in seinem Leben	Lamenting the Weakness of Man's Life	SATB with 2 violins, 2 violas, cello and continuo	—	Telemann Portal; Catalogue TWV
TVWV 4	TVWV 4:19	Fliehet hin, ihr bosen Tage	—	B solo with violin, cello and continuo	—	Telemann Portal; Catalogue TWV
TVWV 4	TVWV 4:20	Nun gen ich aus der Sorgen Banden	—	B solo with continuo	—	Telemann Portal; Catalogue TWV
TVWV 4	TVWV 4:21	Wie so kurz ist unser Leben	—	S solo with flute, horn, 2 violins, viola, cello and continuo	—	Telemann Portal; Catalogue TWV
TVWV 4	TVWV 4:22	Gottlob, es ist vollbracht	—	SATB with 2 oboes, 2 violins, viola, cello and continuo, choir	—	Telemann Portal; Catalogue TWV
TVWV 4	TVWV 4:23	Herr, nimmst du mir was Liebes ab	—	AB solo with 2 flutes, 2 violins, viola, cello and continuo	Fragment	Telemann Portal; Catalogue TWV

=== TVWV 5 – Passion oratorios and Passions ===
Section	Catalogue	Title	Occasion	Scoring	Observation	URL
TVWV 5	TVWV 5:1	Mich vom Stricke meiner Sunden	"Brockes-Passion"	SSSAATTBBB with 3 transverse flutes, recorder, 2 oboes, bassoon, 2 violins, viola, violetta, cello and continuo	—	Telemann Portal; Catalogue TWV
TVWV 5	TVWV 5:2	Schmucke dich, o liebe Seele	"Seliges Erwagen"	SATB with 2 oboes, 2 blowtorches, 2 bassoons, 2 horns, 2 violins, viola, cello and continuo	= TWV Anh. 50:4	Telemann Portal; Catalogue TWV
TVWV 5	TVWV 5:2a	Scumucke dich, o liebe Seele	"Seliges Erwagen"	SATB with flute, 2 oboes, 2 violins, viola, cello and continuo	—	Catalogue TWV
TVWV 5	TVWV 5:3	Mach dich auf, werde Licht!	Conversion to the Roman Church of Captain Cornelius	—	Lost	Telemann Portal; Catalogue TWV
TVWV 5	TVWV 5:4	Nicht das Band, das dich bestricket	"The Crucified Horn or Weeping over the Death of the Savior"	SATB with 2 transverse flutes, chalumeau, oboe d'amore, 2 oboes, 2 violins, viola, violetta, cello and continuo	—	Telemann Portal; Catalogue TWV
TVWV 5	TVWV 5:5	Erhole dich, o Sonne	"Meditation on the 9th Hour of the Day of Jesus' Death"	ATB with 2 flutes, 2 horns, 2 violins, viola, cello and continuo	—	Telemann Portal; Catalogue TWV
TVWV 5	TVWV 5:6	Du, dessen Augen flossen	"The death of Jesus"	SAATBB with 2 transverse flutes, recorder, 2 oboes, oboe d'amore, 2 violins, viola, cello and continuo	—	Telemann Portal; Catalogue TWV
TVWV 5	TVWV 5:7	Wenn meine Sund mich kranken	St. Matthew Passion (1722)	—	Lost	Telemann Portal; Catalogue TWV
TVWV 5	TVWV 5:8	Ein Lammlein gent und tragt die Schuld	St. Mark Passion (1723)	SATB with flute, 2 oboes, oboe d'amore, 2 violins, viola, cello and continuo	—	Telemann Portal; Catalogue TWV
TVWV 5	TVWV 5:9	O Lamm Gottes unschuldig	St. Luke Passion (1724)	—	Lost	Telemann Portal; Catalogue TWV
TVWV 5	TVWV 5:10	Jesu, deine tiefen Wunden	4th Sunday after Easter	—	Lost	Telemann Portal; Catalogue TWV
TVWV 5	TVWV 5:11	O hilf Christe Gottes Sohn	St. Matthew Passion (1726)	—	Lost	Telemann Portal; Catalogue TWV
TVWV 5	TVWV 5:12	Mein Heiland, du bist mir zulieb	St. Mark Passion (1727)	—	Lost	Telemann Portal; Catalogue TWV
TVWV 5	TVWV 5:13	Lukaspassion 1728	Israel, achigeliebtes Vater-Herz!	SATB with 2 transverse flutes, recorder, 2 oboes, bassoon, 2 violins, viola, cello and continuo	—	Telemann Portal; Catalogue TWV
TVWV 5	TVWV 5:14	Unare Sunden-Schuld zu heben	St. John Passion (1729)	—	Lost	Telemann Portal; Catalogue TWV
TVWV 5	TVWV 5:15	Wenn meine Suad mich kranken	St. Matthew Passion (1730)	SATB with 2 transverse flutes, oboe, 2 violins, violetta, cello and continuo	—	Telemann Portal; Catalogue TWV
TVWV 5	TVWV 5:16	Hochheiliges Versohnungsfest	St. Mark Passion (1731)	—	Lost	Telemann Portal; Catalogue TWV
TVWV 5	TVWV 5:17	Brullest du? Gewaltger Donner!	St. Luke Passion (1732)	—	Lost	Telemann Portal; Catalogue TWV
TVWV 5	TVWV 5:18	Du lassest uns durchs Blut	St. John Passion (1733)	SATB with flute, 2 oboes, 2 violins, viola, cello and continuo	—	Telemann Portal; Catalogue TWV
TVWV 5	TVWV 5:19	(Matthäuspassion 1734)	St. Matthew Passion (1734)	—	Lost	Telemann Portal; Catalogue TWV
TVWV 5	TVWV 5:20	Jesu deine tiefen Wunden	St. Mark Passion (1735)	—	Lost	Telemann Portal; Catalogue TWV
TVWV 5	TVWV 5:21	Wenn meine Sund mich kranken	St. Luke Passion (1736)	—	Lost	Telemann Portal; Catalogue TWV
TVWV 5	TVWV 5:22	Jesu, deine heligen Wunden	St. John Passion (1737)	SATB with flute, 2 oboes, 2 violins, viola, cello and continuo	—	Telemann Portal; Catalogue TWV
TVWV 5	TVWV 5:23	O hilf Christe Gottes Sohn	St. Matthew Passion (1738)	—	Lost	Telemann Portal; Catalogue TWV
TVWV 5	TVWV 5:24	O hilf Christe Gottes Sohn	St. Mark Passion (1739)	—	Lost	Telemann Portal; Catalogue TWV
TVWV 5	TVWV 5:25	O hilf Christe Gottes Sohn	St. Luke Passion (1740)	—	Lost	Telemann Portal; Catalogue TWV
TVWV 5	TVWV 5:26	O hilf Christe Gottes Sohn	St. John Passion (1741)	SATB with 2 flutes, 2 oboes, 2 violins, viola, cello and continuo	—	Telemann Portal; Catalogue TWV
TVWV 5	TVWV 5:27	O hilf Christe Gottes Sohn	St. Matthew Passion (1742)	—	Lost	Telemann Portal; Catalogue TWV
TVWV 5	TVWV 5:28	(Markuspassion 1743)	St. Mark Passion (1743)	—	Lost	Telemann Portal; Catalogue TWV
TVWV 5	TVWV 5:29	Wenn meine Sund mich kranken	St. Luke Passion (1744)	SATB with flute, oboe d'amore, 2 violins, viola, cello and continuo	—	Telemann Portal; Catalogue TWV
TVWV 5	TVWV 5:30	Ein Lammlein geht und tragt die Schuld	St. John Passion (1745)	SATB with 2 oboes, bass oboe, 2 violins, viola, cello and continuo	—	Telemann Portal; Catalogue TWV
TVWV 5	TVWV 5:31	Lasst uns mit Ernst betrachten	St. Matthew Passion (1746)	SATB with recorder, oboe, oboe d'amore, 2 horns, 2 violins, viola, cello and continuo	—	Telemann Portal; Catalogue TWV
TVWV 5	TVWV 5:32	Jesu deine tiefen Wunden	St. Mark Passion (1747)	—	Lost	Telemann Portal; Catalogue TWV
TVWV 5	TVWV 5:33	Wisset ihr, dass ihr	St. Luke Passion (1748)	SATB with 2 flutes, oboe, oboe d'amore, 2 violins, viola, cello and continuo	—	Telemann Portal; Catalogue TWV
TVWV 5	TVWV 5:34	Jesu, meines Lebens Leben	St. John Passion (1749)	—	Lost	Telemann Portal; Catalogue TWV
TVWV 5	TVWV 5:35	Wenn meine Sund mich kranken	St. Matthew Passion (1750)	SATB with 2 flutes, 2 oboes, 2 violins, viola, cello and continuo	—	Telemann Portal; Catalogue TWV
TVWV 5	TVWV 5:36	(Markuspassion 1751)	St. Mark Passion (1751)	—	Lost	Telemann Portal; Catalogue TWV
TVWV 5	TVWV 5:37	(Lukaspassion 1752)	St. Luke Passion (1752)	—	Lost	Telemann Portal; Catalogue TWV
TVWV 5	TVWV 5:38	Liebe Seele, nun dich schwinge	St. John Passion (1753)	—	Lost	Telemann Portal; Catalogue TWV
TVWV 5	TVWV 5:39	(Matthäuspassion 1754)	St. Matthew Passion (1754)	—	Lost	Telemann Portal; Catalogue TWV
TVWV 5	TVWV 5:40	Das ist ein kostlich Ding	St. Mark Passion (1755)	SATB with 2 flutes, oboe, 2 violins, viola, cello and continuo	—	Telemann Portal; Catalogue TWV
TVWV 5	TVWV 5:41	(Lukaspassion 1756)	St. Luke Passion (1756)	—	Lost	Telemann Portal; Catalogue TWV
TVWV 5	TVWV 5:42	Kommt zur Freystatt, ihr Betrubten	St. John Passion (1757)	SATB with flute, oboe, 2 violins, viola, cello and continuo	—	Telemann Portal; Catalogue TWV
TVWV 5	TVWV 5:43	Herr, starke mich, dein Leiden zu bedenken	St. Matthew Passion (1758)	SATB with flute, oboe, 2 violins, viola, cello and continuo	—	Telemann Portal; Catalogue TWV
TVWV 5	TVWV 5:44	Und da sie den Lobgesang gesprochen hatten	St. Mark Passion (1759)	SATB with 2 flutes, 2 recorders, 2 oboes, bass oboe, 2 bassoons, 2 violins, viola, cello and continuo	—	Telemann Portal; Catalogue TWV
TVWV 5	TVWV 5:45	Welche, Feind des Kreuzes	St. Luke Passion (1760)	SATB with 2 oboes, 2 violins, viola, cello and continuo	—	Telemann Portal; Catalogue TWV
TVWV 5	TVWV 5:46	Der Herr erhore dich in deiner Not	St. John Passion (1761)	SATB with recorder, 2 transverse flutes, oboe, bass oboe, 2 violins, viola, cello and continuo	—	Telemann Portal; Catalogue TWV
TVWV 5	TVWV 5:47	(Matthäuspassion 1762)	St. Matthew Passion (1762)	—	—	Telemann Portal; Catalogue TWV
TVWV 5	TVWV 5:48	(Markuspassion 1763)	St. Mark Passion (1763)	—	Lost	Telemann Portal; Catalogue TWV
TVWV 5	TVWV 5:49	Lukaspassion 1764	Hier lass uns ruhn, o Teurer!	SATB with flute, 2 oboes, 2 violins, viola, cello and continuo	—	Telemann Portal; Catalogue TWV
TVWV 5	TVWV 5:50	Ach Gott und Herr	St. John Passion (1765)	SATB with 2 oboes, bass oboe, 2 bassoons, 2 violins, viola, cello and continuo	—	Telemann Portal; Catalogue TWV
TVWV 5	TVWV 5:51	Ein Lammlein geht und tragt die Schuld	St. Matthew Passion (1766)	SATB with flute, bass oboe, 2 violins, viola, cello and continuo	—	Telemann Portal; Catalogue TWV
TVWV 5	TVWV 5:52	Christe du Lamm Gottes	St. Mark Passion (1767)	SATB with 2 flutes, oboe, bassoon, 2 horns, 2 violins, viola, cello and continuo	—	Telemann Portal; Catalogue TWV
TVWV 5	TVWV 5:53	(Matthäuspassion 1754 (Danziger Passion))	St. Matthew Passion (1754)	—	—	Telemann Portal; Catalogue TWV

=== TVWV 6 – Sacred oratorios ===
Section	Catalogue	Title	Scoring	Observation	URL
TVWV 6	TVWV 6:1	Davidische Gesange	—	Lost	Catalogue TWV
TVWV 6	TVWV 6:2	Freundschaft gehet über Liebe	—	Lost	Telemann Portal; Catalogue TWV
TVWV 6	TVWV 6:3	Donnerode	—	—	Telemann Portal; Catalogue TWV
TVWV 6	TVWV 6:3a	Wie ist dein Name so groß	SATB with 3 bugles, horn, bassoon, timpani, 2 violins, viola, cello and continuo	—	Catalogue TWV
TVWV 6	TVWV 6:3b	Mein Herz ist voll, vom Geiste Gottes erhoben	SATB with 2 flutes, 2 bugles, horn, 2 violins, viola, cello and concertante cello	—	Catalogue TWV
TVWV 6	TVWV 6:4	Zwei Auszüge aus Klopstocks Messias	SAT with 2 transverse flutes, 2 oboes, bass oboe, 2 bassoons, 2 violins, viola, cello and concertante cello	—	Telemann Portal; Catalogue TWV
TVWV 6	TVWV 6:5	Das befreite Israel	SATB with flute, 2 oboes, 2 bassoons, 3 bugles, 2 horns, timpani, 2 violins, viola, cello and continuo	—	Telemann Portal; Catalogue TWV
TVWV 6	TVWV 6:6	Die Auferstehung und Himmelfahrt Jesu	SATB with 2 flutes, 2 oboes, 3 trumpets, 2 horns, timpani, 2 violins, viola, cello and continuo	—	Telemann Portal; Catalogue TWV
TVWV 6	TVWV 6:7	Die Auferstehung	SATB with 2 flutes, 2 oboes, bass oboe, 3 trumpets, 2 horns, timpani, 2 violins, viola, cello and continuo	—	Telemann Portal; Catalogue TWV
TVWV 6	TVWV 6:8	Der Tag des Gerichts	SATB with 2 oboes, 2 horns, timpani, 2 violins, viola, viola da gamba, cello and continuo	—	Telemann Portal; Catalogue TWV

=== TVWV 7 – Psalms ===
Section	Catalogue	Title	Psalm	Scoring	URL
TVWV 7	TVWV 7:1	Ach Herr, strafe mich nicht	Psalm 6	A solo with 2 violins, viola, cello and continuo	Telemann Portal; Catalogue TWV
TVWV 7	TVWV 7:2	Ach Herr, strafe mich nicht	Psalm 6	S solo with oboe, bassoon, violin, cello and continuo	Telemann Portal; Catalogue TWV
TVWV 7	TVWV 7:3	Ach Herr, strafe mich nicht	Psalm 6	A solo and SATB with 2 violins, bassoon and continuo	Telemann Portal; Catalogue TWV
TVWV 7	TVWV 7:4	Alleluja, singet den Herrn ein neues Lied	Psalms 147 and 149	SATB with 2 oboes, 2 violins, viola, cello and continuo	Telemann Portal; Catalogue TWV
TVWV 7	TVWV 7:5	Danket den Herrn, dens er ist freundlich	Psalm 118	SATB with 2 oboes, 2 horns, bassoon, 2 violins, viola, cello and continuo	Telemann Portal; Catalogue TWV
TVWV 7	TVWV 7:6	Das ist ein kostlich Ding	Psalm 92	SATB with 2 violins, viola, cello and continuo	Telemann Portal; Catalogue TWV
TVWV 7	TVWV 7:7	Deus judicium tuum	Psalms 71 and 72	SATB with 2 flutes, 2 oboes, 2 violins, viola, obbligato cello and continuo	Telemann Portal; Catalogue TWV
TVWV 7	TVWV 7:8	Die auf den Herren hoffen	Psalm 125	SA with 2 oboes, 2 violins, cello and continuo	Telemann Portal; Catalogue TWV
TVWV 7	TVWV 7:9	Die auf den Herrn hoffen	Psalm 125	TB with 2 oboes, 2 violins, cello and continuo	Telemann Portal; Catalogue TWV
TVWV 7	TVWV 7:10	Diem ist der Tag, den der Herr gemacht hat	Psalm 118	SATB with 2 oboes, 2 horns, 2 violins, viola, cello and continuo	Telemann Portal; Catalogue TWV
TVWV 7	TVWV 7:11	Domine ad adjuvandum me	Psalm 69	SATB with 2 violins, viola, cello and continuo	Telemann Portal; Catalogue TWV
TVWV 7	TVWV 7:12	Domine, dominus noster	Psalm 8	SATB with 2 violins, viola, cello and continuo	Telemann Portal; Catalogue TWV
TVWV 7	TVWV 7:13	Exaltabo te Deus	Psalm 145	SB with continuo	Telemann Portal; Catalogue TWV
TVWV 7	TVWV 7:14	Ich danke dem Herrn von ganzem Herzen	Psalm 111	SATB with 2 oboes, piccolo bugle, 2 violins, viola, cello and continuo	Telemann Portal; Catalogue TWV
TVWV 7	TVWV 7:15	Ich habe meine Augen auf zu den Bergen	Psalm 121	T with violin and continuo	Telemann Portal; Catalogue TWV
TVWV 7	TVWV 7:16	Ich habe meine Augen auf zu den Bergen	Psalm 121	SATB with 2 oboes, 2 violins, viola, cello and continuo	Telemann Portal; Catalogue TWV
TVWV 7	TVWV 7:17	Ich habe meine Augen auf zu den Bergen	Psalm 121	SBB with oboe, 2 violins, viola, cello and continuo	Telemann Portal; Catalogue TWV
TVWV 7	TVWV 7:18	Ich will den Herrn loben	Psalm 34	SA with cello and continuo	Telemann Portal; Catalogue TWV
TVWV 7	TVWV 7:19	Ihr seid die Gesegneten des Herrn	Psalm 115	SATB with oboe, 2 violins, viola, cello and continuo	Telemann Portal; Catalogue TWV
TVWV 7	TVWV 7:20	Jauchzet dem Herrn alle Welt	Psalm 100	B solo with oboe, bugle, 2 violins, viola, cello and continuo	Telemann Portal; Catalogue TWV
TVWV 7	TVWV 7:21	Jauchzet dem Herrn alle Welt	Psalm 100	B solo with 2 bugles, cello and continuo	Telemann Portal; Catalogue TWV
TVWV 7	TVWV 7:22	Jauchzet dem Herrn alle Welt	Psalm 100	STB with 2 flutes, 2 violins, viola, cello and continuo	Telemann Portal; Catalogue TWV
TVWV 7	TVWV 7:23	Jehova pascit me	Psalm 23	SB solo, 2 flutes, 2 oboes, 2 violins, viola, cello and continuo	Telemann Portal; Catalogue TWV
TVWV 7	TVWV 7:24	Jubilate Deo, omnia terra	Psalm 100	SATB with [2 flutes], 2 violins, viola, cello and continuo	Telemann Portal; Catalogue TWV
TVWV 7	TVWV 7:25	Laudate Jehovah omnes gentes	Psalm 117	SATB with 2 violins, viola, cello and continuo	Telemann Portal; Catalogue TWV
TVWV 7	TVWV 7:26	Laudate pueri Dominum	Psalm 113	S solo with 2 violins, viola, cello and continuo	Telemann Portal; Catalogue TWV
TVWV 7	TVWV 7:27	Lobe den Herrn meine Seele	Psalm 104	SATB with 2 oboes, 2 bugles, 2 violins, viola, cello and continuo	Telemann Portal; Catalogue TWV
TVWV 7	TVWV 7:28	Lobet den Herrn alle Heiden, Halleluja!	Psalm 117	SATB with 2 violins, viola, cello and continuo	Telemann Portal; Catalogue TWV
TVWV 7	TVWV 7:29	Lobet den Herrn alle Heiden	Psalm 117	TTB with cello and continuo	Telemann Portal; Catalogue TWV
TVWV 7	TVWV 7:30	Singet dem Herrn ein neues Lied	Psalm 96	SATB with 2 violins, viola, cello and continuo	Telemann Portal; Catalogue TWV
TVWV 7	TVWV 7:31	Der Herr ist Konig und herrlich geschmuckt	Psalm 93	B solo with oboe, bassoon, 2 violins, viola, cello and continuo	Telemann Portal; Catalogue TWV
TVWV 7	TVWV 7:32	Schmecket und sehet, wie freundlich der Herr ist	Psalm 34	S solo with violin and continuo	Telemann Portal; Catalogue TWV

=== TVWV 8 – Motets ===
Section	Catalogue	Title	Occasion	Scoring	Observation	URL
TVWV 8	TVWV 8:1	Amans disciplinam	—	ST solo with cello and continuo	—	Telemann Portal; Catalogue TWV
TVWV 8	TVWV 8:2	Amen, Lob und Ehre	—	SA(T)B with continuo	—	Telemann Portal; Catalogue TWV
TVWV 8	TVWV 8:3	Danket dem Herrn, denn er ist freundlich	Motet for Christmas	SATB and SATB	—	Telemann Portal; Catalogue TWV
TVWV 8	TVWV 8:4	Der Gott unsers Herrn Jesu Christi	Motet for Pentecost (appendix to Vespers)	SATB with continuo	—	Telemann Portal; Catalogue TWV
TVWV 8	TVWV 8:5	Der Herr gibt Weisheit	—	SAB with cello and continuo	—	Telemann Portal; Catalogue TWV
TVWV 8	TVWV 8:6	Der Herr ist König	—	SATB	—	Telemann Portal; Catalogue TWV
TVWV 8	TVWV 8:7	Ein feste Burg ist unser Gott	—	SATB with continuo	—	Telemann Portal; Catalogue TWV
TVWV 8	TVWV 8:8	Es segne uns Gott, unser Herr	—	SATB with continuo	—	Telemann Portal; Catalogue TWV
TVWV 8	TVWV 8:9	Halt, was du hast, dass niemand deine Krone nehme	—	SATB and SATB with continuo	—	Telemann Portal; Catalogue TWV
TVWV 8	TVWV 8:10	Jauchzet dem Herrn alle Welt	—	SATB and SATB	= BWV Anh. 160	Telemann Portal; Catalogue TWV
TVWV 8	TVWV 8:11	Laudate dominum	—	SATB with continuo	—	Telemann Portal; Catalogue TWV
TVWV 8	TVWV 8:12	Non aemulare cum viris malititiae	—	SB solo with cello and continuo	—	Telemann Portal; Catalogue TWV
TVWV 8	TVWV 8:13	Selig sind die Toten	—	SATB with continuo	—	Telemann Portal; Catalogue TWV
TVWV 8	TVWV 8:14	Und das Wort ward Fleisch	—	SATB	—	Telemann Portal; Catalogue TWV
TVWV 8	TVWV 8:15	Werfet Panier auf im Lande	—	SATB with continuo	—	Telemann Portal; Catalogue TWV
TVWV 8	TVWV 8:16	Wohl dem, der den Herrn fürchtet	—	SA with continuo	—	Telemann Portal; Catalogue TWV
TVWV 8	TVWV 8:17	Das ist meine Freude	—	—	—	Telemann Portal; Catalogue TWV
TVWV 8	TVWV 8:18	Fürwahr, er trug	—	—	—	Telemann Portal; Catalogue TWV
TVWV 8	TVWV 8:19	Selig sind die Toten	—	—	—	Telemann Portal; Catalogue TWV
TVWV 8	TVWV 8:20	Ich habe Lust abzuscheiden	—	—	—	Telemann Portal; Catalogue TWV
TVWV 8	TVWV 8:21	Rufe mich an	—	—	—	Telemann Portal; Catalogue TWV
TVWV 8	TVWV 8:22	Saget der Tochter Zions	—	—	—	Telemann Portal; Catalogue TWV
TVWV 8	TVWV 8:23	Ich will schauen	—	—	—	Telemann Portal; Catalogue TWV

=== TVWV 9 – Masses, Magnificat, and individual works ===
Section	Catalogue	Title	Occasion	Scoring	URL
TVWV 9	TVWV 9:1	Missa sopra: Ach Gott, vom Himmel sieh darein	—	SATB	Telemann Portal; Catalogue TWV
TVWV 9	TVWV 9:2	Missa sopra: Allein Gott in der Höh sei Ehr	—	SATB	Telemann Portal; Catalogue TWV
TVWV 9	TVWV 9:3	Missa sopra: Christ lag in Todesbanden	—	SATB	Telemann Portal; Catalogue TWV
TVWV 9	TVWV 9:4	Missa sopra: Durch Adams Fall ist ganz verderbt	—	SATB	Telemann Portal; Catalogue TWV
TVWV 9	TVWV 9:5	Missa sopra: Ein Kindelein so löbelich	—	SATB with continuo	Telemann Portal; Catalogue TWV
TVWV 9	TVWV 9:6	Missa sopra: Erbarm dich mein, o Herre Gott	—	SATB with continuo	Telemann Portal; Catalogue TWV
TVWV 9	TVWV 9:7	Missa sopra: Es wird schier der letzte Tag kommen	—	SATTB with (2 oboes), 2 violins, viola, cello and continuo	Telemann Portal; Catalogue TWV
TVWV 9	TVWV 9:8	Missa sopra: Es woll uns Gott genädig sein	—	SATB	Telemann Portal; Catalogue TWV
TVWV 9	TVWV 9:9	Missa sopra: Gott, der Vater, wohn uns bei	—	SATB	Telemann Portal; Catalogue TWV
TVWV 9	TVWV 9:10	Missa sopra: Komm, heiliger Geist	—	SATB	Telemann Portal; Catalogue TWV
TVWV 9	TVWV 9:11	Missa sopra: Komm, heiliger Geist	—	SATB with continuo	Telemann Portal; Catalogue TWV
TVWV 9	TVWV 9:12	Missa alla siciliana	—	SATB with 2 violins and continuo	Telemann Portal; Catalogue TWV
TVWV 9	TVWV 9:13	Missa	—	SATB with (bassoon, waist), 2 violins, viola, cello and continuo	Telemann Portal; Catalogue TWV
TVWV 9	TVWV 9:14	Missa [brevis]	—	A solo with bassoon, 2 violins, cello and continuo	Telemann Portal; Catalogue TWV
TVWV 9	TVWV 9:15	Missa brevis	—	S Solo and SATB	Telemann Portal; Catalogue TWV
TVWV 9	TVWV 9:16	Sanctus	"Sanctus" and "Pleni sunt coeli"	SATB with 3 bugles, timpani, 2 violins, viola, cello and continuo	Telemann Portal; Catalogue TWV
TVWV 9	TVWV 9:17	Magnificat anima mea	—	SATBB with 3 bugles, timpani, 2 violins, viola, cello and continuo	Telemann Portal; Catalogue TWV
TVWV 9	TVWV 9:18	Meine Seele erhebt den Herrn	German Magnificat	SATB with 2 recorders, 2 oboes, 2 horns, 2 violins, viola, cello and continuo	Telemann Portal; Catalogue TWV
TVWV 9	TVWV 9:19	Amen	—	SATB with 2 bugles, 2 violins, viola, cello and continuo	Telemann Portal; Catalogue TWV
TVWV 9	TVWV 9:20	Lobet den Herrn, alle Heiden	—	SATB with 2 violins, viola, cello and continuo	Telemann Portal; Catalogue TWV

=== TVWV 10 – Collections ===
Section	Catalogue	Title	Scoring	Observation	URL
TVWV 10	TVWV 10:1	Fast allgemeines evangelisch-musicalisches Liederbuch	—	—	Telemann Portal; Catalogue TWV
TVWV 10	TVWV 10:2	Herr, unser Herrscher	—	Two-Part Canon	Telemann Portal; Catalogue TWV
TVWV 10	TVWV 10:3	Herr, wie lange willt du mein so gar vergessen	—	Two-Part Canon	Telemann Portal; Catalogue TWV
TVWV 10	TVWV 10:4	Danket dem Herrn, denn er ist freundlich	—	Two-Part Canon	Telemann Portal; Catalogue TWV
TVWV 10	TVWV 10:5	Ach Herr, strafe mich nicht in deinem Zorn	—	Two-Part Canon	Telemann Portal; Catalogue TWV
TVWV 10	TVWV 10:6	Ich will den Herrn loben, so lange ich lebe	—	Three-Part Canon	Telemann Portal; Catalogue TWV
TVWV 10	TVWV 10:7	Wie der Hirsch schreiet nach frischem Wasser	—	Three-Part Canon	Telemann Portal; Catalogue TWV
TVWV 10	TVWV 10:8	Ich will den Herrn loben alle Zeit	—	Three-Part Canon	Telemann Portal; Catalogue TWV
TVWV 10	TVWV 10:9	Gott sei mir gnädig nach deiner Güte	—	Three-Part Canon	Telemann Portal; Catalogue TWV
TVWV 10	TVWV 10:10	Gott ist unsre Zuversicht und Stärke	—	Four-Part Canon	Telemann Portal; Catalogue TWV
TVWV 10	TVWV 10:11	Hilf mir, Gott, durch deinen Namen	—	Four-Part Canon	Telemann Portal; Catalogue TWV
TVWV 10	TVWV 10:12	Wohl dem, dem die Übertretungen vergeben sind	—	Four-Part Canon	Telemann Portal; Catalogue TWV
TVWV 10	TVWV 10:13	Gott sei uns gnädig und segne uns	—	Four-Part Canon	Telemann Portal; Catalogue TWV
TVWV 10	TVWV 10:14	Gedenke doch, wie ich so elend	S solo with 2 violins, viola, cello and continuo	= TVWV 1:583	Telemann Portal; Catalogue TWV
TVWV 10	TVWV 10:15	Wachset in der Gnade und Erkenntnis	S solo with 2 violins, viola, cello and continuo	= TVWV 1:1491, TVWV 10:17	Telemann Portal; Catalogue TWV
TVWV 10	TVWV 10:16	Es spricht, der solches zeuget	S solo with 2 violins, viola, cello and continuo	= TVWV 1:532	Telemann Portal; Catalogue TWV
TVWV 10	TVWV 10:17	Wachset in der Gnade und Erkenntnis	S solo with 2 violins, viola, cello and continuo	= TVWV 1:1491, TVWV 10:15	Telemann Portal; Catalogue TWV
TVWV 10	TVWV 10:18	Wer sich rächet	S solo with 2 violins, viola, cello and continuo	= TVWV 1:1601	Telemann Portal; Catalogue TWV
TVWV 10	TVWV 10:19	Sichres Menschenkind, erschrecke	S solo with 2 violins, viola, cello and continuo	—	Telemann Portal; Catalogue TWV
TVWV 10	TVWV 10:20	Sünder, ach zerfließt in Tränen	S solo with 2 violins, viola, cello and continuo	—	Telemann Portal; Catalogue TWV
TVWV 10	TVWV 10:21	Ich bin ein Glied an deinem Leibe	SB with 2 violins, viola, cello and continuo	—	Telemann Portal; Catalogue TWV
TVWV 10	TVWV 10:22	Was frag ich nach der Welt?	AT with 2 violins, viola, cello and continuo	—	Telemann Portal; Catalogue TWV
TVWV 10	TVWV 10:23	Mein Herze, gib dich nur darein	ST with 2 violins, viola, cello and continuo	—	Telemann Portal; Catalogue TWV
TVWV 10	TVWV 10:24	Weg, ihr eiteln Ehren!	AB with 2 violins, viola, cello and continuo	—	Telemann Portal; Catalogue TWV
TVWV 10	TVWV 10:25	Gott ist vor uns! o segensvoller Ruhm!	SA with 2 violins, viola, cello and continuo	—	Telemann Portal; Catalogue TWV
TVWV 10	TVWV 10:26	Ich fürcht und traue Gott in allen Dingen	AT with 2 violins, viola, cello and continuo	—	Telemann Portal; Catalogue TWV
TVWV 10	TVWV 10:27	Meine Seele trägt Verlangen	SB with 2 violins, viola, cello and continuo	—	Telemann Portal; Catalogue TWV
TVWV 10	TVWV 10:28	Ich armer Mensch! was soll ich sagen?	AT with 2 violins, viola, cello and continuo	—	Telemann Portal; Catalogue TWV
TVWV 10	TVWV 10:29	So wechselt unsre Zeit	ST with 2 violins, viola, cello and continuo	—	Telemann Portal; Catalogue TWV
TVWV 10	TVWV 10:30	Nichts können wir uns selbst gewähren	SB with 2 violins, viola, cello and continuo	—	Telemann Portal; Catalogue TWV
TVWV 10	TVWV 10:31	Wie's Gott gefällt, gefällt mir's auch	AB with 2 violins, viola, cello and continuo	—	Telemann Portal; Catalogue TWV

=== TVWV 11 – Cantatas and serenades for weddings ===
Section	Catalogue	Title	Scoring	Occasion	Observation	URL
TVWV 11	TVWV 11:0	Empfinde Welt mein rauhes Herrschen	—	Serenade for the marriage of princess Caroline Christiane and Carl von Hessen	Not Preserved	Telemann Portal; Catalogue TWV
TVWV 11	TVWV 11:1	Ihr lieblichen Taler, annehaliche Felder	SATB with 2 oboes, 2 violins, viola, cello and continuo	Wedding of Wilhelm von Eisenach	Telemann Portal; Catalogue TWV	
TVWV 11	TVWV 11:2	Vermischet euch, helebte Saiten	—	Lastrop-Tonnies wedding	Lost	Telemann Portal; Catalogue TWV
TVWV 11	TVWV 11:3	Eroffhe die Quellen der Gnade von oben	—	Volkmar-Drapen wedding	Lost	Telemann Portal; Catalogue TWV
TVWV 11	TVWV 11:4	Ehen sind begluckt zu nennen	—	Bene-Block wedding	Lost	Telemann Portal; Catalogue TWV
TVWV 11	TVWV 11:5	(Hochzeitsmusik Münch, Johann Carl/Bergen, Anna Sibylle von den)	—	Munch wedding	Lost	Telemann Portal; Catalogue TWV
TVWV 11	TVWV 11:6	Ihr zaubernden Tone entzucket, berucket die Herzen	—	Coldorf-Tonnies wedding	Lost	Telemann Portal; Catalogue TWV
TVWV 11	TVWV 11:7	Hochzeit, Hochzeit, o Kern der Frolichkeit	—	Greve-Gullia wedding	Lost	Telemann Portal; Catalogue TWV
TVWV 11	TVWV 11:8	Greif zur tapferen Gegenwehr	—	Lutterloh-Beltgen wedding	Lost	Telemann Portal; Catalogue TWV
TVWV 11	TVWV 11:9	Verkehrter Lauf verderbter Zeiten	—	Hinsen-Fabar wedding	Lost	Telemann Portal; Catalogue TWV
TVWV 11	TVWV 11:10	Verkehrter Lauf verderbter Zeiten	—	Hinsen-Fabar wedding	Paired with Serenade TVWV 24:1	Telemann Portal; Catalogue TWV
TVWV 11	TVWV 11:11	(Hochzeitsmusik Friedrich Carl zu Norwegen und Schleswig-Holstein/Anna Petrowna von Russland)	—	Wedding of Carl Friedrich de Norvège to Princess Anna Petrowa	Lost	Telemann Portal; Catalogue TWV
TVWV 11	TVWV 11:12	Edle Stunden, da sich zwo vollkomme Seelen	—	Boetefeuer-Coldorff wedding	Lost	Telemann Portal; Catalogue TWV
TVWV 11	TVWV 11:13	Entrais dich der Erde verhasstem Getummel	—	Corthum-Greve wedding	Lost	Telemann Portal; Catalogue TWV
TVWV 11	TVWV 11:14	Ihr scherzenden Winde, ihr spielenden Lufte	—	Hylms-Greve wedding	Not Preserved	Telemann Portal; Catalogue TWV
TVWV 11	TVWV 11:15	(Musik zur Jubelhochzeit Mutzenbecher, Mathias und Maria Catharina (geb. Ecken))	SATB with flute, oboe, bassoon, 3 bugles, timpani, 2 violins, viola, cello and continuo	Mutzenbecher golden wedding anniversary	—	Telemann Portal; Catalogue TWV
TVWV 11	TVWV 11:15a	Herr Gott, dich loben wir	SATB with flute, oboe, bassoon, 3 bugles, timpani, 2 violins, viola, cello and continuo	Mutzenbecher golden wedding anniversary	—	Catalogue TWV
TVWV 11	TVWV 11:15b	Nun hilf uns Gott, den Dienern dein	SATB with flute, oboe, bassoon, 3 bugles, timpani, 2 violins, viola, cello and continuo	Mutzenbecher golden wedding anniversary	—	Catalogue TWV
TVWV 11	TVWV 11:15c	O erhabnes Glück der Ehe	SATB with flute, chalumeau, oboe, bassoon, 2 violins, viola, cello and continuo	Mutzenbecher golden wedding anniversary	—	Catalogue TWV
TVWV 11	TVWV 11:16	(Musik zur Jubelhochzeit Wurmb, Ludwig Heinrich von)	—	Ludwig Heinrich von Wurab's golden wedding anniversary	—	Telemann Portal; Catalogue TWV
TVWV 11	TVWV 11:17	Der Herr hat Grosses an uns getan	—	Luttmann-Mutzenbecher Wedding Jubilee	Lost	Telemann Portal; Catalogue TWV
TVWV 11	TVWV 11:18	Entbrannter Andacht helle Flammen	—	Mattfeld-Scheller Wedding Jubilee	Lost	Telemann Portal; Catalogue TWV
TVWV 11	TVWV 11:19	(Unknown)	—	Langermann wedding	Lost	Telemann Portal; Catalogue TWV
TVWV 11	TVWV 11:20	Auch dieser Tag moll deine Feste	—	Wedding of King Joseph II and Josepha	Lost	Telemann Portal; Catalogue TWV
TVWV 11	TVWV 11:21	Auf, ihr art'gen Liebes-Gotter	—	Entertainment and musical choreography for a wedding	Lost	Telemann Portal; Catalogue TWV
TVWV 11	TVWV 11:22	Drei schone Dinge sind	SATB with 2 oboes, 3 hunting horns, 2 violins, viola, cello and continuo	—	—	Telemann Portal; Catalogue TWV
TVWV 11	TVWV 11:23	Ein wohlgezogen Weib ist nicht zu bezahlen	—	—	Fragment	Telemann Portal; Catalogue TWV
TVWV 11	TVWV 11:24	Es woll und Gott genadig sein	SSB with 2 violins, viola, cello and continuo	—	—	Telemann Portal; Catalogue TWV
TVWV 11	TVWV 11:25	Herr, hebe an zu segnen das Haus	SB with 2 violins, viola, cello and continuo	—	—	Telemann Portal; Catalogue TWV
TVWV 11	TVWV 11:26	Liebe, was ist schoner als die Liebe	ST with 2 oboes, 2 violins, viola, cello and continuo	—	—	Telemann Portal; Catalogue TWV
TVWV 11	TVWV 11:27	Lieblich und schon sein ist nichts	ATB with oboe, 2 horns, 2 violins, viola, cello and continuo	—	—	Telemann Portal; Catalogue TWV
TVWV 11	TVWV 11:28	Lustig bei dem Hochzeits-Schmause	S or B with continuo	—	—	Telemann Portal; Catalogue TWV
TVWV 11	TVWV 11:29	Seid fruchtbar, mehret euch	SATB with 2 flutes, 2 horns, 2 violins, viola, cello and continuo	—	—	Telemann Portal; Catalogue TWV
TVWV 11	TVWV 11:30	Sprich treuer Himmel: Ja	B solo with oboe, 2 bassoons, 2 violins, cello and continuo	—	—	Telemann Portal; Catalogue TWV
TVWV 11	TVWV 11:31	Wem ein tugendsam Weib bescheret ist	SB with 2 bugles, 2 horns, timpani, 2 violins, viola, cello and continuo	—	—	Telemann Portal; Catalogue TWV
TVWV 11	TVWV 11:32	Was Gott einmal gesegnet hat	B(SATB) with 2 oboes, 2 violins, viola, cello and continuo	—	Fragment	Telemann Portal; Catalogue TWV

=== TVWV 12 – Compositions for birthdays ===
Section	Catalogue	Title	Scoring	Occasion	Observation	URL
TVWV 12	TVWV 12:1	(Musik zur Geburt Leopold, Herzog von Österreich)	SATB with 2 flutes, 2 oboes, 3 bugles, timpani, 2 violins, viola, cello and continuo	Birth of Leopold, Duke of Austria	—	Telemann Portal; Catalogue TWV
TVWV 12	TVWV 12:1a	Auf Christenheit, begeh ein Freudenfest	SATB with 2 flutes, 2 oboes, 3 bugles, timpani, 2 violins, viola, cello and continuo	Birth of Leopold, Duke of Austria	—	Catalogue TWV
TVWV 12	TVWV 12:1b	Auf, ihr treuen Untertanen	SATB with 2 flutes, 2 oboes, 3 bugles, timpani, 2 violins, viola, cello and continuo	Birth of Leopold, Duke of Austria	—	Catalogue TWV
TVWV 12	TVWV 12:1c	Germania mit ihrem Chor	SATB with 2 oboes, 3 bugles, 3 piccolo bugles, 2 horns, 2 hunting horns, timpani, 2 violins, viola, cello and continuo	Birth of Leopold, Duke of Austria	—	Catalogue TWV
TVWV 12	TVWV 12:2	(Musik zur Geburt von Karl Philipp August, Pfalzgraf bei Rhein)	—	Birth of Karl Philipp August, Count Palatine of the Rhine	Lost	Telemann Portal; Catalogue TWV
TVWV 12	TVWV 12:3	Willkommen, schoner Freudentag	SATB with 2 oboes, 2 violins, viola, cello and continuo	—	—	Telemann Portal; Catalogue TWV
TVWV 12	TVWV 12:4	Unare Freude wohnt in dir	SATB with 2 piccolo, 2 bassoons, 2 violins, viola, cello and continuo	Birthday of Magdalena Sibylle, Duchess/Christiane Wilhelmine, Princess of Saxony-Eisenach	—	Telemann Portal; Catalogue TWV
TVWV 12	TVWV 12:5	Erheitre dich mit guldnen Strahlen	—	Birthday of Petrus Theodor Seelmann	Not Preserved	Telemann Portal; Catalogue TWV
TVWV 12	TVWV 12:6	Erklingt durch gedopelt annehmliche Tone	SATB with 2 oboes, 2 violins, viola, cello and continuo	—	—	Telemann Portal; Catalogue TWV
TVWV 12	TVWV 12:7	Kommt mit mir, ihr sussen Freuden (Serenade "Le Plaisir")	SATB with recorder, 2 oboes, 2 bassoons, 2 horns, 2 violins, viola, cello and continuo	Birthday of Magdalena Sibylle, Duchess of Saxony-Eisenach	—	Telemann Portal; Catalogue TWV
TVWV 12	TVWV 12:8	Ich will dem Herrn singen mein Lebelang	SATB with 2 oboes, 2 violins, viola, cello and continuo	Birthday of Anna Sophia Charlotte, Duchess of Saxony-Eisenach	—	Telemann Portal; Catalogue TWV
TVWV 12	TVWV 12:9	(Geburtstagsmusik Christian VI., König von Dänemark)	—	Birthday of Christian VI, King of Denmark	Lost	Telemann Portal; Catalogue TWV
TVWV 12	TVWV 12:10	Lyksalig Tvillung-Rige!	SB solo and SATB with 2 violins and continuo	Birthday of Frederick V, King of Denmark	—	Telemann Portal; Catalogue TWV
TVWV 12	TVWV 12:11	Grossmachtiger Monarch der Britten	SB with flute, 3 bugles, timpani, 2 violins, viola, cello and continuo	Birthday of George II, King of Great Britain	—	Telemann Portal; Catalogue TWV

=== TVWV 13 – Works for political celebrations ===
Section	Catalogue	Title	Scoring	Occasion	Observation	URL
TVWV 13	TVWV 13:0	Ach Frankfurth, ach! wie steht's um dich	—	—	Lost	Telemann Portal; Catalogue TWV
TVWV 13	TVWV 13:1	Wie lieblich sind auf dem Berge die Füße der Boten	—	Thanksgiving for the end of the War of the Spanish Succession (1715)	Not Preserved	Telemann Portal; Catalogue TWV
TVWV 13	TVWV 13:2	Man singet mit Freuden vom Sieg	—	Thanksgiving for the victory of Charles VI at Semlin (1716)	Lost	Telemann Portal; Catalogue TWV
TVWV 13	TVWV 13:3	Der Herr Zebaoth ist mit uns	—	Thanksgiving for the Peace of Passarowitz in Serbia (1718)	Lost	Telemann Portal; Catalogue TWV
TVWV 13	TVWV 13:4	Vermischet euch, ihr Jubeltöne, mit Anmut	—	Serenade for Peace between Russia and Sweden (1721)	Lost	Telemann Portal; Catalogue TWV
TVWV 13	TVWV 13:5a	Stimmet die fast verstimmten Saiten	—	—	Lost	Telemann Portal; Catalogue TWV
TVWV 13	TVWV 13:5b	Zeuch, teures Haupt, zeuch mit den Deinen	SATB with 2 oboes, 2 violins, viola, cello and continuo	—	—	Catalogue TWV
TVWV 13	TVWV 13:6	Auf zur Freude, zum Scherzen, zum Klingen	—	Serenade for the Visit of the Duke of Brunswick-Lüneburg to Hamburg (1725)	Lost	Telemann Portal; Catalogue TWV
TVWV 13	TVWV 13:7	Jauchet dem Herrn alle Welt	—	200th anniversary of the Augsburg Confession, performed at St. Peter's Church in Hamburg (1730)	Lost	Telemann Portal; Catalogue TWV
TVWV 13	TVWV 13:8	Es stehe Gott auf, dass seine Feinde zerstreuet werden	—	200th anniversary of the Augsburg Confession, performed at St. Nicholas's Church in Hamburg (1730)	Lost	Telemann Portal; Catalogue TWV
TVWV 13	TVWV 13:9	Sey tausenmahl willkommen, o auserwahlter Tag	—	200th anniversary of the Augsburg Confession, performed at St. Catherine's Church in Hamburg (1730)	Incomplete	Telemann Portal; Catalogue TWV
TVWV 13	TVWV 13:10	Das Evangelium, das Wort des Lebens	—	200th anniversary of the Augsburg Confession, performed at St. Michael's Church in Hamburg (1730)	Lost	Telemann Portal; Catalogue TWV
TVWV 13	TVWV 13:11	Gott, wir habens mit unseren Ohren gehoret	—	200th anniversary of the Augsburg Confession, performed at St. Gertrude's Church in Hamburg (1730)	Not Preserved	Telemann Portal; Catalogue TWV
TVWV 13	TVWV 13:12	Saumet nicht langer, ihr frohlichen	—	Coronation of Holy Roman Emperor Charles VII	Not Preserved	Telemann Portal; Catalogue TWV
TVWV 13	TVWV 13:13	Gebeut, du Vater der Gnade	SATB with 2 flutes, 3 bugles, timpani, 2 violins, viola, cello and continuo	Inauguration of the new Christianeum building in Altona	—	Telemann Portal; Catalogue TWV
TVWV 13	TVWV 13:14	Geschlagene Pauken, auf, auf!	SATB with 2 flutes, 2 oboes, 2 bugles, timpani, 2 violins, viola, cello and continuo	Inauguration of the new Christianeum building in Altona	—	Telemann Portal; Catalogue TWV
TVWV 13	TVWV 13:15	Jauchzet dem Herrn alle Welt	—	Coronation of Holy Roman Emperor Francis I	Lost	Telemann Portal; Catalogue TWV
TVWV 13	TVWV 13:16	Gott sprach, es werde Licht	—	Coronation of Holy Roman Emperor Francis I	Not Preserved	Telemann Portal; Catalogue TWV
TVWV 13	TVWV 13:17	Du Herr bist unser Gott	—	100th anniversary of the Peace of Westphalia (1748)	Lost	Telemann Portal; Catalogue TWV
TVWV 13	TVWV 13:18	Holder Friede, heilger Glaube, dich zu kussen	SATB with 2 transverse flutes / 2 recorders, 3 bugles, timpani, 2 violins, viola, cello and continuo	200th Anniversary of the Peace of Augsburg	—	Telemann Portal; Catalogue TWV
TVWV 13	TVWV 13:19	Halleluja, Amen, Lob und Ehr und Weisheit und Dank	SATB with 2 flutes, 3 bugles, timpani, 2 violins, viola, cello and continuo	Thanksgiving for the Victories at Lobositz (1756)	—	Telemann Portal; Catalogue TWV
TVWV 13	TVWV 13:20	Hannover siegt, der Franzmann liegt	S solo with 2 flutes, 2 oboes, 2 violins, viola, cello and continuo	Oratorio for the Victory of Hanover	—	Telemann Portal; Catalogue TWV
TVWV 13	TVWV 13:21	Bleibe, lieber König, leben	B solo with 3 bugles, timpani, 2 violins, viola, cello and continuo	—	—	Telemann Portal; Catalogue TWV
TVWV 13	TVWV 13:22	Herr, wir danken deiner Gnade	B solo with 2 violins, viola, cello and continuo	Aria for the successful advance of the allied armies in Hesse	—	Telemann Portal; Catalogue TWV
TVWV 13	TVWV 13:23	Dass wir nach gedampften Kriegen	—	Election of Holy Roman Emperor Joseph II	Not Preserved	Telemann Portal; Catalogue TWV
TVWV 13	TVWV 13:24	Willkommen, auserwählter Fürst	—	Cantata for the Visit of Count Georg Wilhelm of Bayreuth to Frankfurt	Lost	Telemann Portal; Catalogue TWV
TVWV 13	TVWV 13:25	Von Gnade und Recht will ich singen	SATB with 2 oboes, 2 horns, 2 violins, viola, cello and continuo	—	Psalm 101	Telemann Portal; Catalogue TWV

=== TVWV 14 – Compositions for schools in Hamburg and Altona ===
Section	Catalogue	Title	Scoring	Occasion	Observation	URL
TVWV 14	TVWV 14:1	(Musik zum Examen im Johanneum)	—	Acts for the examinations at the Johanneum in Hamburg (1722)	Lost	Telemann Portal; Catalogue TWV
TVWV 14	TVWV 14:2	Sey gegrusset, edle Feier	—	200th anniversary celebration of the Augsburg Confession, held in the Gymnasium	Lost	Telemann Portal; Catalogue TWV
TVWV 14	TVWV 14:3	(Musik zur 200-Jahrfeier der Augsburgischen Konfession (Johanneum))	—	200th anniversary of the Augsburg Confession at the Johanneum	—	Telemann Portal; Catalogue TWV
TVWV 14	TVWV 14:3a	Komm, heiliger Geist, erfülle	—	200th anniversary of the Augsburg Confession at the Johanneum	Lost	Catalogue TWV
TVWV 14	TVWV 14:3b	Halleluja	—	200th anniversary of the Augsburg Confession at the Johanneum	Lost	Catalogue TWV
TVWV 14	TVWV 14:3c	Ein feste Burg ist unser Gott	SATB with 3 bugles, timpani, 2 violins, viola, cello and continuo	200th anniversary of the Augsburg Confession at the Johanneum	—	Catalogue TWV
TVWV 14	TVWV 14:4	Wo sich Ruh' und Friede küssen	—	Aria for a school act	—	Telemann Portal; Catalogue TWV
TVWV 14	TVWV 14:5	(Oratorium im Johanneum)	—	Oratorium at Johanneum	Lost	Telemann Portal; Catalogue TWV
TVWV 14	TVWV 14:6	Maiora suetis	—	Latin Ode for the Christianeum in Altona (1749)	Lost	Telemann Portal; Catalogue TWV
TVWV 14	TVWV 14:7	O quam lata vis amoris dei	SS solo with violin, viola and continuo	—	—	Telemann Portal; Catalogue TWV
TVWV 14	TVWV 14:8	Mit Danken und mit Loben	—	Cantata for the inauguration of a new Gymnasium building in Hamburg (1751)	Not Preserved	Telemann Portal; Catalogue TWV
TVWV 14	TVWV 14:9	In der ersten Unschuld sterben	S solo with 2 violins, viola, cello and continuo	Air for the school act in Hamburg	—	Catalogue TWV
TVWV 14	TVWV 14:10	Gott ist in Juda bekannt	—	200th Anniversary of the Peace of Augsburg (Gymnasium)	Lost	Telemann Portal; Catalogue TWV
TVWV 14	TVWV 14:11	Laetare juvenis in juventute tua	SATB with 2 violins and continuo	Cantata for School Examinations in Hamburg	—	Telemann Portal; Catalogue TWV
TVWV 14	TVWV 14:12	Gott, man lobet dich in der Stille	SATBB with 2 flutes, 2 oboes, bassoon, 2 bugles, 2 horns, timpani, 2 violins, viola, cello and continuo	Cantata for the Boys’ Celebration (1763) at the Gymnasium	—	Telemann Portal; Catalogue TWV
TVWV 14	TVWV 14:13	Deus, aperi coelorum	SS or SA with cello and continuo	—	—	Telemann Portal; Catalogue TWV
TVWV 14	TVWV 14:14	O terra felicissima	SA with cello and continuo	—	—	Telemann Portal; Catalogue TWV
TVWV 14	TVWV 14:15	Friede, dich preisen die Hirten und Herden	S solo with 2 violins, viola and continuo	—	—	Telemann Portal; Catalogue TWV
TVWV 14	TVWV 14:16	Friede, dich preisen die Hirten und Herden	SS with 2 violins and continuo	Cantata for School Examinations	—	Telemann Portal; Catalogue TWV
TVWV 14	TVWV 14:17	Gehe hin zur Ameise, du Fauler	S or AB with (2 violins) and continuo	—	—	Telemann Portal; Catalogue TWV
TVWV 14	TVWV 14:18	Fein säuberlich müsst ihr verfahren	S solo with 2 violins, viola and continuo	—	—	Telemann Portal; Catalogue TWV
TVWV 14	TVWV 14:19	Holder Frühling muntrer Jugend	S with ?	—	—	Telemann Portal; Catalogue TWV
TVWV 14	TVWV 14:20	In omni tempore dedit confessionem	SATB with flute, 2 oboes, 2 violins, viola, cello and continuo	Cantata for School Examinations	—	Telemann Portal; Catalogue TWV
TVWV 14	TVWV 14:21	Studiosa salve ter corona	SA(T)B	Cantata for School Examinations	Fragment	Telemann Portal; Catalogue TWV

=== TVWV 15 – Oratorios and serenades for the Mayor ===
Section	Catalogue	Title	Scoring	Observation	URL
TVWV 15	TVWV 15:1	(Kapitänsmusik 1723)	—	Lost	Telemann Portal; Catalogue TWV
TVWV 15	TVWV 15:2	(Kapitänsmusik 1724)	SATBB with flute, oboe, bassoon, 2 violins, viola, cello and continuo	—	Telemann Portal; Catalogue TWV
TVWV 15	TVWV 15:2a	Freuet euch des Herrn, ihr Gerechten	SATBB with flute, oboe, bassoon, 2 violins, viola, cello and continuo	Oratorio	Catalogue TWV
TVWV 15	TVWV 15:2b	Geliebter Aufenthalt, beglückte Stille	SATBB with flute, oboe, bassoon, 2 violins, viola, cello and continuo	Serenade	Catalogue TWV
TVWV 15	TVWV 15:3	(Kapitänsmusik 1725)	—	Lost	Telemann Portal; Catalogue TWV
TVWV 15	TVWV 15:4	Mit innigstem Ergetzen	SA(S)TBBB with flute, chaluneau, 2 oboes, oboe d'amore, clarinetto, 2 trombones, piccolo trombone, 2 violins, viola, cello and continuo	Serenade	Telemann Portal; Catalogue TWV
TVWV 15	TVWV 15:5	(Kapitänsmusik 1730)	SATBBB with 2 violins, viola, cello and continuo	—	Telemann Portal; Catalogue TWV
TVWV 15	TVWV 15:5a	Jauchze, jubilier und singe	SATBBB with 2 violins, viola, cello and continuo	Oratorio	Catalogue TWV
TVWV 15	TVWV 15:5b	Zu Walle, zu Walle!	SATBBB with 2 violins, viola, cello and continuo	Serenade	Catalogue TWV
TVWV 15	TVWV 15:6	(Kapitänsmusik 1731)	—	Lost	Telemann Portal; Catalogue TWV
TVWV 15	TVWV 15:6a	Ich danke dem Herrn	—	Oratorio; Lost	Catalogue TWV
TVWV 15	TVWV 15:6b	Vereint euch und singet bei allgemeiner Lust	—	Serenade; Lost	Catalogue TWV
TVWV 15	TVWV 15:7	(Kapitänsmusik 1734)	—	Lost	Telemann Portal; Catalogue TWV
TVWV 15	TVWV 15:7a	Unsichtbare Sonne, Meer voll ew'ger Wonne	—	Oratorio; Lost	Catalogue TWV
TVWV 15	TVWV 15:7b	Die Trommel ertönet; auf Helden zum Kampf	—	Serenade; Lost	Catalogue TWV
TVWV 15	TVWV 15:8	(Kapitänsmusik 1735)	—	Lost	Telemann Portal; Catalogue TWV
TVWV 15	TVWV 15:9	(Kapitänsmusik 1736)	SSTBB with 2 flutes, 2 violins, viola, cello and continuo	—	Telemann Portal; Catalogue TWV
TVWV 15	TVWV 15:9a	Preise, Jerusalem, den Herrn	SSTBB with 2 flutes, 2 violins, viola, cello and continuo	Oratorio	Catalogue TWV
TVWV 15	TVWV 15:9b	So kömmt die kühne Tapferkeit	SSTBB with 2 flutes, 2 violins, viola, cello and continuo	Serenade	Catalogue TWV
TVWV 15	TVWV 15:10	(Kapitänsmusik 1737)	—	Lost	Telemann Portal; Catalogue TWV
TVWV 15	TVWV 15:11	(Kapitänsmusik 1738)	SATBB with 2 flutes, 2 oboes, bassoon, 2 horns, 2 violins, viola, cello and continuo	—	Telemann Portal; Catalogue TWV
TVWV 15	TVWV 15:11a	Wohl dem Volke	SATBB with 2 flutes, 2 oboes, bassoon, 2 horns, 2 violins, viola, cello and continuo	Oratorio	Catalogue TWV
TVWV 15	TVWV 15:11b	Es locket die Trommel mit wirbelnden Schlägen	SATBB with 2 flutes, 2 oboes, bassoon, 2 horns, 2 violins, viola, cello and continuo	Serenade	Catalogue TWV
TVWV 15	TVWV 15:12	(Kapitänsmusik 1739)	—	Lost	Telemann Portal; Catalogue TWV
TVWV 15	TVWV 15:12a	Unerschöpfliches Meer der Liebe	—	Oratorio; Lost	Catalogue TWV
TVWV 15	TVWV 15:12b	Dich zu beschützen	—	Serenade; Lost	Catalogue TWV
TVWV 15	TVWV 15:13	(Kapitänsmusik 1742)	SATB with flute, oboe, 2 trombones, 2 horns, drum, 2 violins, viola, cello and continuo	—	Telemann Portal; Catalogue TWV
TVWV 15	TVWV 15:13a	Der Herr ist meine Stärke	SATB with flute, oboe, 2 trombones, 2 horns, drum, 2 violins, viola, cello and continuo	Oratorio	Catalogue TWV
TVWV 15	TVWV 15:13b	Schlagt die Trommel, blast Trompeten	SATB with flute, oboe, 2 trombones, 2 horns, drum, 2 violins, viola, cello and continuo	Serenade	Catalogue TWV
TVWV 15	TVWV 15:14	(Kapitänsmusik 1743)	—	Lost	Telemann Portal; Catalogue TWV
TVWV 15	TVWV 15:14a	Ertönet ein Jauchzen, ihr freudigen Chöre	—	Oratorio; Lost	Catalogue TWV
TVWV 15	TVWV 15:14b	Wir dienen der Freiheit	—	Serenade; Lost	Catalogue TWV
TVWV 15	TVWV 15:15	(Kapitänsmusik 1744)	SSATB with 2 oboes, bassoon, 2 horns, timpani, 2 violins, viola, cello and continuo	—	Telemann Portal; Catalogue TWV
TVWV 15	TVWV 15:15a	Vereint euch, ihr Bürger, und singet mit Freuden	SSATB with 2 oboes, bassoon, 2 horns, timpani, 2 violins, viola, cello and continuo	Oratorio	Catalogue TWV
TVWV 15	TVWV 15:15b	Freiheit! Göttin, die Segen und Friede begleitet	SSATB with flute, recorder, 2 oboes, 2 horns, drum, 2 violins, viola, cello and continuo	Serenade	Catalogue TWV
TVWV 15	TVWV 15:16	(Kapitänsmusik 1749)	—	Not Preserved	Telemann Portal; Catalogue TWV
TVWV 15	TVWV 15:16a	Erwacht und ertönet und jauchzet itzt wieder	—	Oratorio; Not Preserved	Catalogue TWV
TVWV 15	TVWV 15:16b	Euch, die der Himmel den Sterblichen schicket	—	Serenade; Not Preserved	Catalogue TWV
TVWV 15	TVWV 15:17	(Kapitänsmusik 1752)	—	Lost	Telemann Portal; Catalogue TWV
TVWV 15	TVWV 15:17a	Fürchtet den Herrn und dienet ihm treulich	—	Oratorio; Lost	Catalogue TWV
TVWV 15	TVWV 15:17b	Die Zeiten, die so schnell verfließen	—	Serenade; Lost	Catalogue TWV
TVWV 15	TVWV 15:18	(Kapitänsmusik 1753)	—	Not Preserved	Telemann Portal; Catalogue TWV
TVWV 15	TVWV 15:19	(Kapitänsmusik 1754)	—	Not Preserved	Telemann Portal; Catalogue TWV
TVWV 15	TVWV 15:19a	Singt Ehre, singt Ehre, geheiligte Chöre	—	Oratorio; Not Preserved	Catalogue TWV
TVWV 15	TVWV 15:19b	Wirbelt, ihr Trommeln, lärmt Trompeten	—	Serenade; Not Preserved	Catalogue TWV
TVWV 15	TVWV 15:20	(Kapitänsmusik 1755)	SATB with 2 transverse flutes, 2 recorders, 2 oboes, 2 bugles, 2 violins, viola, cello and continuo	—	Telemann Portal; Catalogue TWV
TVWV 15	TVWV 15:20a	Danket dem Herrn, denn er ist freundlich	SATB with 2 transverse flutes, 2 recorders, 2 oboes, 2 bugles, 2 violins, viola, cello and continuo	Oratorio	Catalogue TWV
TVWV 15	TVWV 15:20b	Ihr rüstigen Wächter hamburgischer Zinnen	SATB with 2 flutes, 2 recorders, recorder, piccolo, 2 oboes, bass oboe, 2 bugles, drum, 2 violins, viola, cello and continuo	Serenade	Catalogue TWV
TVWV 15	TVWV 15:21	(Kapitänsmusik 1756)	SATB with 2 flutes, 2 oboes, 2 bassoons, horn, 2 violins, viola, cello and continuo	—	Telemann Portal; Catalogue TWV
TVWV 15	TVWV 15:22	(Kapitänsmusik 1759)	—	Lost	Telemann Portal; Catalogue TWV
TVWV 15	TVWV 15:22a	Herr, unser Gott, von deiner Huld durchdrungen	—	Oratorio; Lost	Catalogue TWV
TVWV 15	TVWV 15:22b	Wir dienen der Freiheit, wir sind ihr zur Seite	—	Serenade; Lost	Catalogue TWV
TVWV 15	TVWV 15:23	(Kapitänsmusik 1760)	SATB(SSTT) with 2 flutes, recorder, oboe, 2 bugles, 2 violins, viola, cello and continuo	—	Telemann Portal; Catalogue TWV
TVWV 15	TVWV 15:23a	Herr, du bist gerecht	SATB (SSTT) with 2 violins, viola, cello and continuo	Oratorio	Catalogue TWV
TVWV 15	TVWV 15:23b	Wir nähren, wir zieren	SATB(SSTT) with 2 flutes, recorder, oboe, 2 bugles, 2 violins, viola, cello and continuo	Serenade	Catalogue TWV
TVWV 15	TVWV 15:24	(Kapitänsmusik 1761)	—	—	Telemann Portal; Catalogue TWV
TVWV 15	TVWV 15:25	(Kapitänsmusik 1763/1764)	SATBB (SSS) with 2 flutes, 2 oboes, 2 bugles, 2 horns, timpani, drum, 2 violins, viola, cello and continuo	—	Telemann Portal; Catalogue TWV
TVWV 15	TVWV 15:25a	Der Herr Zebaoth ist mit uns	SATBB (SSS) with 2 oboes, 2 bugles, 2 horns, timpani, 2 violins, viola, cello and continuo	Oratorio	Catalogue TWV
TVWV 15	TVWV 15:25b	Trompeten und Hörner, erschallet	SATBB (SSS) with 2 flutes, 2 oboes, 2 bugles, 2 horns, timpani, drum, 2 violins, viola, cello and continuo	Serenade	Catalogue TWV
TVWV 15	TVWV 15:26	(Kapitänsmusik 1765)	—	Lost	Telemann Portal; Catalogue TWV
TVWV 15	TVWV 15:27	Schließet die Kette der Einigkeit feste	SATB with 2 violins, viola, cello and continuo	—	Telemann Portal; Catalogue TWV

=== TVWV 20 – Secular cantatas ===
Section	Catalogue	Title	Scoring	Observation	URL
TVWV 20	TVWV 20:1	Es ging Lisander und Elpin	—	Lost	Telemann Portal; Catalogue TWV
TVWV 20	TVWV 20:2	Ertöne, muntrer Musen-Chor	—	Lost	Telemann Portal; Catalogue TWV
TVWV 20	TVWV 20:3	Ich bin vergnügt, was soll ich sorgen!	—	Lost	Telemann Portal; Catalogue TWV
TVWV 20	TVWV 20:4	Constant dans le revers	—	Not Preserved	Telemann Portal; Catalogue TWV
TVWV 20	TVWV 20:5	Un coeur plein de civilité	—	Not Preserved	Telemann Portal; Catalogue TWV
TVWV 20	TVWV 20:6	Le plus beau dessous les cieux	—	Not Preserved	Telemann Portal; Catalogue TWV
TVWV 20	TVWV 20:7	Servez, servez la gloire	—	Not Preserved	Telemann Portal; Catalogue TWV
TVWV 20	TVWV 20:8	Revenant des plaines de Mars	—	Not Preserved	Telemann Portal; Catalogue TWV
TVWV 20	TVWV 20:9	Celui qui dans le monde veut être distingué	—	Not Preserved	Telemann Portal; Catalogue TWV
TVWV 20	TVWV 20:10	Alles redet itzt und singet	SB with 3 transverse flutes, piccolo, 2 oboes, bassoon, 2 violins, viola, cello and continuo	—	Telemann Portal; Catalogue TWV
TVWV 20	TVWV 20:11	Freuet euch und seid fröhlich	—	Lost	Telemann Portal; Catalogue TWV
TVWV 20	TVWV 20:12	Wie die Vögel fliegen	—	Lost	Telemann Portal; Catalogue TWV
TVWV 20	TVWV 20:13	Wie? Schlafet ihr, verstummte Saiten?	—	Lost	Telemann Portal; Catalogue TWV
TVWV 20	TVWV 20:14	Tönet, schallet, klingt, ihr Saiten	—	Lost	Telemann Portal; Catalogue TWV
TVWV 20	TVWV 20:15	Ich kann lachen, weinen, scherzen	S solo with continuo	—	Telemann Portal; Catalogue TWV
TVWV 20	TVWV 20:16	Voll feuriger Regung	—	Not Preserved	Telemann Portal; Catalogue TWV
TVWV 20	TVWV 20:17	Dich wird stets mein Herz erlesen	A or B solo with flute, recorder, oboe, 2 violins, viola, cello and continuo	—	Telemann Portal; Catalogue TWV
TVWV 20	TVWV 20:18	Mein Vergnügen wird sich fügen	S solo with flute, recorder, oboe, 2 violins, viola, cello and continuo	—	Telemann Portal; Catalogue TWV
TVWV 20	TVWV 20:19	Mein Schicksal zeigt mir nur von ferne	S or T solo with flute, recorder, oboe, 2 violins, viola, cello and continuo	—	Telemann Portal; Catalogue TWV
TVWV 20	TVWV 20:20	Dein Auge tränt; ach weine nicht	A or B solo with flute, recorder, oboe, 2 violins, viola, cello and continuo	—	Telemann Portal; Catalogue TWV
TVWV 20	TVWV 20:21	Lieben will ich	S or T solo with flute, recorder, oboe, 2 violins, viola, cello and continuo	—	Telemann Portal; Catalogue TWV
TVWV 20	TVWV 20:22	In einem Tal, umringt von hohen Eichen	A or B solo with flute, recorder, oboe, 2 violins, viola, cello and continuo	—	Telemann Portal; Catalogue TWV
TVWV 20	TVWV 20:23	Die Zeit verzehrt die eignen Kinder	S solo with continuo	—	Telemann Portal; Catalogue TWV
TVWV 20	TVWV 20:24	Hoffe nur, geplagtes Herze	S solo with continuo	—	Telemann Portal; Catalogue TWV
TVWV 20	TVWV 20:25	Guten Morgen, faules Glücke!	S solo with continuo	—	Telemann Portal; Catalogue TWV
TVWV 20	TVWV 20:26	Ihr Hunger-Leider, ruht einmal	S solo with continuo	—	Telemann Portal; Catalogue TWV
TVWV 20	TVWV 20:27	Lasst mich über Falschheit klagen	S solo with continuo	—	Telemann Portal; Catalogue TWV
TVWV 20	TVWV 20:28	Furchtsam weinen, ängstlich schweigen	S solo with continuo	—	Telemann Portal; Catalogue TWV
TVWV 20	TVWV 20:29	Fraget nicht, vergnügte Freunde	S solo with violin or flute and continuo	—	Telemann Portal; Catalogue TWV
TVWV 20	TVWV 20:30	So fort, ihr angestimmten Töne	S solo with violin or flute and continuo	—	Telemann Portal; Catalogue TWV
TVWV 20	TVWV 20:31	Der Glanz, wonach der Ehrgeiz zielet	S solo with violin or flute and continuo	—	Telemann Portal; Catalogue TWV
TVWV 20	TVWV 20:32	Du bist ein tolles Ungeheuer	S solo with violin or flute and continuo	—	Telemann Portal; Catalogue TWV
TVWV 20	TVWV 20:33	In euch, ihr grünen Auen	S solo with violin or flute and continuo	—	Telemann Portal; Catalogue TWV
TVWV 20	TVWV 20:34	Freunde, Freunde! lasst uns besser lieben	S solo with violin or flute and continuo	—	Telemann Portal; Catalogue TWV
TVWV 20	TVWV 20:35	Serenata für Carl Friedrich Kaltschmieds anlässlich der Verleihung der Würde eines öffentlichen Lehrers der Arzneikunst an der Universität Jena	—	Lost	Telemann Portal; Catalogue TWV
TVWV 20	TVWV 20:36	Polyphème	—	Lost	Telemann Portal; Catalogue TWV
TVWV 20	TVWV 20:37	O weh, mein Canarin ist tot	S solo with 2 violins, viola, cello and continuo	—	Telemann Portal; Catalogue TWV
TVWV 20	TVWV 20:38	Hinkende Dichter am Helikons Rande	—	Not Preserved	Telemann Portal; Catalogue TWV
TVWV 20	TVWV 20:39	Der Morgen kommt	SATB with 2 flutes, 2 oboes, 2 violins, viola, cello and continuo	—	Telemann Portal; Catalogue TWV
TVWV 20	TVWV 20:40	Willkommen, allmächtiger Mai	SB solo with 2 flutes, 2 recorders, 2 oboes, chalumeau, 2 bassoons, bugle, horn, 2 violins, viola, cello and continuo	—	Telemann Portal; Catalogue TWV
TVWV 20	TVWV 20:41	Wohin, wo soll ich hin?	S solo with 2 flutes, 2 horns, 2 violins, viola, cello and continuo	—	Telemann Portal; Catalogue TWV
TVWV 20	TVWV 20:42	No, non turbarti	S solo with 2 horns, 2 violins, viola, cello and continuo	—	Telemann Portal; Catalogue TWV
TVWV 20	TVWV 20:43	Amor heißt mich freudig lachen	S solo with continuo	—	Telemann Portal; Catalogue TWV
TVWV 20	TVWV 20:44	Bin ich denn so gar verlassen	S solo with violin and continuo	—	Telemann Portal; Catalogue TWV
TVWV 20	TVWV 20:45	Bist du denn gar von Stahl und Eisen	S or B with violin or oboe and continuo	—	Telemann Portal; Catalogue TWV
TVWV 20	TVWV 20:46	Bleicher Sorgen Kummer-Nächte	B solo with 2 violins and continuo	—	Telemann Portal; Catalogue TWV
TVWV 20	TVWV 20:47	Der Mond zog nach und nach	T solo with continuo	—	Telemann Portal; Catalogue TWV
TVWV 20	TVWV 20:48	Die Hoffnung ist mein Leben	B solo with 2 violins, cello and continuo	—	Telemann Portal; Catalogue TWV
TVWV 20	TVWV 20:49	Du angenehmer Weiberorden	S solo with 2 violins, viola and continuo	—	Telemann Portal; Catalogue TWV
TVWV 20	TVWV 20:50	Geht (nun), ihr unvergnügten Sorgen	SB solo with oboe, 2 violins, viola, cello and continuo	—	Telemann Portal; Catalogue TWV
TVWV 20	TVWV 20:51	Gönne doch dem freien Munde	S solo with violin, cello and continuo	—	Telemann Portal; Catalogue TWV
TVWV 20	TVWV 20:52	Gute Nacht, du Ungetreuer	SB solo with oboe, violin, viola and continuo	—	Telemann Portal; Catalogue TWV
TVWV 20	TVWV 20:53	Ha, ha, wo will wi hüt noch danzen	S solo with violin, cello and continuo	—	Telemann Portal; Catalogue TWV
TVWV 20	TVWV 20:54	Haltet ein, ihr schönsten Blicke	S solo with continuo	—	Telemann Portal; Catalogue TWV
TVWV 20	TVWV 20:55	Ich hass' und fliehe zwar die Liebe	S solo with continuo	—	Telemann Portal; Catalogue TWV
TVWV 20	TVWV 20:56	Ich liebe dich wie meine Seele	S solo with continuo	—	Telemann Portal; Catalogue TWV
TVWV 20	TVWV 20:57	Ihr Jungen, sperrt die Augen auf	SATB with 2 oboes, 2 bassoons, 2 horns, 2 violins, viola, cello and continuo	—	Telemann Portal; Catalogue TWV
TVWV 20	TVWV 20:58	Mein Herze lachet vor Vergnügen	B solo with continuo	—	Telemann Portal; Catalogue TWV
TVWV 20	TVWV 20:59	Mein Vergnügen heißt mich sterben	B solo with violin, cello and continuo	—	Telemann Portal; Catalogue TWV
TVWV 20	TVWV 20:60	Nichts Vergnügter's ist auf Erden	B solo with violin and continuo	—	Telemann Portal; Catalogue TWV
TVWV 20	TVWV 20:61	Parti, mi lasci	Solo S with flute, violin, cello and continuo	—	Telemann Portal; Catalogue TWV
TVWV 20	TVWV 20:62	Pastorella venga bella	S solo with violin, cello and continuo	= HWV Anh. B 125	Telemann Portal; Catalogue TWV
TVWV 20	TVWV 20:63	Perché vezzoso	S solo with violin, cello and continuo	—	Telemann Portal; Catalogue TWV
TVWV 20	TVWV 20:64	Reicher Herbst, ihr kühlen Lüfte	T solo with violin and continuo	—	Telemann Portal; Catalogue TWV
TVWV 20	TVWV 20:65	Ruht itzt sanft, ihr zarten Glieder	S solo with continuo	—	Telemann Portal; Catalogue TWV
TVWV 20	TVWV 20:66	Sagt, ihr allerschönsten Lippen	B solo with continuo	—	Telemann Portal; Catalogue TWV
TVWV 20	TVWV 20:67	Seufzen, Kummer, Angst und Tränen	A solo with continuo	—	Telemann Portal; Catalogue TWV
TVWV 20	TVWV 20:68	So bald wird man das nicht vergessen	S solo with continuo	—	Telemann Portal; Catalogue TWV
TVWV 20	TVWV 20:69	Soll die Marter meiner Seelen	S solo with continuo	—	Telemann Portal; Catalogue TWV
TVWV 20	TVWV 20:70	Süße Hoffnung, wenn ich frage	S solo with 2 bassoons, 2 violins, viola, cello and continuo	—	Telemann Portal; Catalogue TWV
TVWV 20	TVWV 20:71	Unbestand ist das Gift verliebter Seelen	S solo with continuo	—	Telemann Portal; Catalogue TWV
TVWV 20	TVWV 20:72	Unbestand ist das Gift verliebter Seelen	S solo with violin and continuo	—	Telemann Portal; Catalogue TWV
TVWV 20	TVWV 20:73	Voglio amarti, o caro nume	S solo with violin and continuo	—	Telemann Portal; Catalogue TWV
TVWV 20	TVWV 20:74	Von geliebten Augen brennen	S solo with violin and continuo	—	Telemann Portal; Catalogue TWV
TVWV 20	TVWV 20:75	Die syrische Unruh oder Die beleidigte Liebe	S solo with violin and continuo	= TVWV 21:113, TVWV 21:139	Telemann Portal; Catalogue TWV

=== TVWV 21 – Operas and arias ===
Section	Grouping	Catalogue	Title	Scoring	Observation	URL
TVWV 21	—	TVWV 21:0	Gelassenheit, du Labsal stiller Seelen	—	Operetta (dialogue) for the birth of Princess Anne Sophie Charlotte; Lost	Catalogue TWV
TVWV 21	—	TVWV 21:1	Der lachende Democritus	—	Singspiel in 3 acts; Lost	Telemann Portal; Catalogue TWV
TVWV 21	—	TVWV 21:2	Ferdinand und Isabella	—	Opera in 5 acts; Lost	Telemann Portal; Catalogue TWV
TVWV 21	—	TVWV 21:3	Cajus Caligula	—	Opera in 3 acts; Lost	Telemann Portal; Catalogue TWV
TVWV 21	—	TVWV 21:4	Adonis	—	Opera in 3 acts; Fragment	Telemann Portal; Catalogue TWV
TVWV 21	—	TVWV 21:5	Narcissus	—	Opera in 3 acts; Fragment	Telemann Portal; Catalogue TWV
TVWV 21	—	TVWV 21:6	Mario	—	Opera in 3 acts; Fragment	Telemann Portal; Catalogue TWV
TVWV 21	—	TVWV 21:7	Der unglückliche Alcmeon	—	Opera; Lost	Telemann Portal; Catalogue TWV
TVWV 21	—	TVWV 21:8	Die Satyrn in Arkadien	—	Opera in 3 acts	Telemann Portal; Catalogue TWV
TVWV 21	—	TVWV 21:9	Der geduldige Socrates	—	Comic Singspiel in 3 acts	Telemann Portal; Catalogue TWV
TVWV 21	—	TVWV 21:10	Sieg der Schönheit	—	Opera in 3 acts	Telemann Portal; Catalogue TWV
TVWV 21	—	TVWV 21:11	Das Ende der babylonischen Gefangenschaft oder Belsazer	—	Opera in 3 acts; Fragment	Telemann Portal; Catalogue TWV
TVWV 21	—	TVWV 21:12	Alarich	—	—	Telemann Portal; Catalogue TWV
TVWV 21	—	TVWV 21:13	Der Beschluss des Karnevals, Dritte Handlung	—	Not Preserved	Telemann Portal; Catalogue TWV
TVWV 21	—	TVWV 21:14	Omphale	—	Singspiel in 5 acts; Fragment	Telemann Portal; Catalogue TWV
TVWV 21	—	TVWV 21:15	Pimpinone oder Die ungleiche Heirat	—	Opera	Telemann Portal; Catalogue TWV
TVWV 21	—	TVWV 21:16	La Caprizziosa e il Credulo	—	Opera in 3 acts; Fragment	Telemann Portal; Catalogue TWV
TVWV 21	—	TVWV 21:17	Adelheid	—	Opera in 3 acts; Fragment	Telemann Portal; Catalogue TWV
TVWV 21	—	TVWV 21:18	Die wunderbare Beständigkeit der Liebe oder Orpheus	—	Musical drama; Lost	Telemann Portal; Catalogue TWV
TVWV 21	—	TVWV 21:19	Calypso oder Sieg der Weisheit über die Liebe	—	Singspiel in 3 acts; Fragment	Telemann Portal; Catalogue TWV
TVWV 21	—	TVWV 21:20	Sancio oder Die siegende Großmut	—	Opera in 3 acts; Fragment	Telemann Portal; Catalogue TWV
TVWV 21	—	TVWV 21:21	Buffonet und Alga oder Die manntolle alte Jungfer	—	Lost	Telemann Portal; Catalogue TWV
TVWV 21	—	TVWV 21:22	Die Amours der Vespetta oder Der Galan in der Kiste	—	Not Preserved	Telemann Portal; Catalogue TWV
TVWV 21	—	TVWV 21:23	Die verkehrte Welt	—	Comic opera; Fragment	Telemann Portal; Catalogue TWV
TVWV 21	—	TVWV 21:24	Miriways	—	Singspiel in 3 acts	Telemann Portal; Catalogue TWV
TVWV 21	—	TVWV 21:25	Die lasttragende Liebe oder Emma und Eginhard	—	Opera in 3 acts	Telemann Portal; Catalogue TWV
TVWV 21	—	TVWV 21:26	Aesopus bei Hofe	—	Opera in 3 acts; Fragment	Telemann Portal; Catalogue TWV
TVWV 21	—	TVWV 21:27	Flavius Bertaridus, König der Longobarden	—	Opera in 3 acts	Telemann Portal; Catalogue TWV
TVWV 21	—	TVWV 21:28	Frohlocket, ihr Musen	—	Not Preserved	Telemann Portal; Catalogue TWV
TVWV 21	—	TVWV 21:29	Margaretha, Königin von Castilien	—	Opera in 3 acts; Lost	Telemann Portal; Catalogue TWV
TVWV 21	—	TVWV 21:30	Der Weiseste in Sidon	—	Opera in 3 acts; Lost	Telemann Portal; Catalogue TWV
TVWV 21	—	TVWV 21:31	Die rachbegierige Liebe oder Orasia, verwitwete Königin in Thracien	—	Opera in 3 acts; Lost	Telemann Portal; Catalogue TWV
TVWV 21	—	TVWV 21:32	Don Quichotte auf der Hochzeit des Comacho	—	Serenade	Telemann Portal; Catalogue TWV
TVWV 21	—	TVWV 21:33	Adam und Eva	—	Operetta; Fragment	Telemann Portal; Catalogue TWV
TVWV 21	—	TVWV 21:34	Hercules und Alceste	—	Comedy; Fragment	Telemann Portal; Catalogue TWV
TVWV 21	—	TVWV 21:35	Herodes und Mariamne	—	Opera; Fragment; Erroneous Attribution	Telemann Portal; Catalogue TWV
TVWV 21	—	TVWV 21:36	Fragment einer Serenata	—	Opera aria; Fragment	Telemann Portal; Catalogue TWV
TVWV 21	Germanicus	TVWV 21:101	Rimembraza crudel sempre il mio cor fedel penir fera	S solo with recorder, 2 oboes, 2 bassoons, 2 horns, 2 violins, viola, cello and continuo	—	Telemann Portal; Catalogue TWV
TVWV 21	Germanicus	TVWV 21:102	Se disai die legarmi	S solo with recorder, 2 oboes, 2 bassoons, 2 horns, 2 violins, viola, cello and continuo	—	Telemann Portal; Catalogue TWV
TVWV 21	Germanicus	TVWV 21:103	No lacci crudeli no	S solo with recorder, 2 oboes, 2 bassoons, 2 horns, 2 violins, viola, cello and continuo	—	Telemann Portal; Catalogue TWV
TVWV 21	Germanicus	TVWV 21:104	Piante voi ch'ia lido al meno	S solo with recorder, 2 oboes, 2 bassoons, 2 horns, 2 violins, viola, cello and continuo	—	Telemann Portal; Catalogue TWV
TVWV 21	Germanicus	TVWV 21:105	Tranquilate vi pensieri	S solo with recorder, 2 oboes, 2 bassoons, 2 horns, 2 violins, viola, cello and continuo	—	Telemann Portal; Catalogue TWV
TVWV 21	Germanicus	TVWV 21:106	Komm o Schlaf und lass mein Leiden	S solo with recorder, 2 oboes, 2 bassoons, 2 horns, 2 violins, viola, cello and continuo	—	Telemann Portal; Catalogue TWV
TVWV 21	Germanicus	TVWV 21:107	Amor, hilf mir uberwinden	S solo with recorder, 2 oboes, 2 bassoons, 2 horns, 2 violins, viola, cello and continuo	—	Telemann Portal; Catalogue TWV
TVWV 21	Germanicus	TVWV 21:108	Susse Hoffnung, wenn ich frage	S solo with recorder, 2 oboes, 2 bassoons, 2 horns, 2 violins, viola, cello and continuo	—	Telemann Portal; Catalogue TWV
TVWV 21	Germanicus	TVWV 21:109	Gelosia ti sento al core	S solo with recorder, 2 oboes, 2 bassoons, 2 horns, 2 violins, viola, cello and continuo	—	Telemann Portal; Catalogue TWV
TVWV 21	Germanicus	TVWV 21:110	Ho risolto d'adorarvi	S solo with recorder, 2 oboes, 2 bassoons, 2 horns, 2 violins, viola, cello and continuo	—	Telemann Portal; Catalogue TWV
TVWV 21	Germanicus	TVWV 21:111	Fortuna arridial	S solo with recorder, 2 oboes, 2 bassoons, 2 horns, 2 violins, viola, cello and continuo	—	Telemann Portal; Catalogue TWV
TVWV 21	Germanicus	TVWV 21:112	Sempre in vitta mia costanza	S solo with recorder, 2 oboes, 2 bassoons, 2 horns, 2 violins, viola, cello and continuo	—	Telemann Portal; Catalogue TWV
TVWV 21	—	TVWV 21:113	Die syrische Unruh oder Die beleidigte Liebe	S solo with recorder, 2 oboes, 2 bassoons, 2 horns, 2 violins, viola, cello and continuo	= TVWV 20:75, TVWV 21:139	Telemann Portal; Catalogue TWV
TVWV 21	Germanicus	TVWV 21:114	Lass mich doch Mitleid erlangen	S solo with recorder, 2 oboes, 2 bassoons, 2 horns, 2 violins, viola, cello and continuo	—	Telemann Portal; Catalogue TWV
TVWV 21	Germanicus	TVWV 21:115	Consolati, o cor	S solo with recorder, 2 oboes, 2 bassoons, 2 horns, 2 violins, viola, cello and continuo	—	Telemann Portal; Catalogue TWV
TVWV 21	Germanicus	TVWV 21:116	Sei standhaft, armes Herz	S solo with recorder, 2 oboes, 2 bassoons, 2 horns, 2 violins, viola, cello and continuo	—	Telemann Portal; Catalogue TWV
TVWV 21	Germanicus	TVWV 21:117	Non troppo tenaci d'amor le catene	S solo with recorder, 2 oboes, 2 bassoons, 2 horns, 2 violins, viola, cello and continuo	—	Telemann Portal; Catalogue TWV
TVWV 21	Germanicus	TVWV 21:118	A le scosse di fortuna	S solo with recorder, 2 oboes, 2 bassoons, 2 horns, 2 violins, viola, cello and continuo	—	Telemann Portal; Catalogue TWV
TVWV 21	Germanicus	TVWV 21:119	Wer da hoffet zu geniessen	S solo with recorder, 2 oboes, 2 bassoons, 2 horns, 2 violins, viola, cello and continuo	—	Telemann Portal; Catalogue TWV
TVWV 21	Germanicus	TVWV 21:120	Dieses Herz ist nicht vor dich	S solo with recorder, 2 oboes, 2 bassoons, 2 horns, 2 violins, viola, cello and continuo	—	Telemann Portal; Catalogue TWV
TVWV 21	Germanicus	TVWV 21:121	Ich komme, schonste Augen	S solo with recorder, 2 oboes, 2 bassoons, 2 horns, 2 violins, viola, cello and continuo	—	Telemann Portal; Catalogue TWV
TVWV 21	Germanicus	TVWV 21:122	Bald hoffe ich zu sehen	S solo with recorder, 2 oboes, 2 bassoons, 2 horns, 2 violins, viola, cello and continuo	—	Telemann Portal; Catalogue TWV
TVWV 21	Germanicus	TVWV 21:123	Werter Vatter, gehst du fort	S solo with recorder, 2 oboes, 2 bassoons, 2 horns, 2 violins, viola, cello and continuo	—	Telemann Portal; Catalogue TWV
TVWV 21	Germanicus	TVWV 21:124	Kommet nur, ihr heissen Flammen	S solo with recorder, 2 oboes, 2 bassoons, 2 horns, 2 violins, viola, cello and continuo	—	Telemann Portal; Catalogue TWV
TVWV 21	Germanicus	TVWV 21:125	Arditi pensieri	S solo with recorder, 2 oboes, 2 bassoons, 2 horns, 2 violins, viola, cello and continuo	—	Telemann Portal; Catalogue TWV
TVWV 21	Germanicus	TVWV 21:126	Mein Herze ist voll Grimm und Wut	S solo with recorder, 2 oboes, 2 bassoons, 2 horns, 2 violins, viola, cello and continuo	—	Telemann Portal; Catalogue TWV
TVWV 21	Germanicus	TVWV 21:127	Mein Herz kennt kein Mitleid mehr	S solo with recorder, 2 oboes, 2 bassoons, 2 horns, 2 violins, viola, cello and continuo	—	Telemann Portal; Catalogue TWV
TVWV 21	Germanicus	TVWV 21:128	Wen Amors Pfeil getroffen	S solo with recorder, 2 oboes, 2 bassoons, 2 horns, 2 violins, viola, cello and continuo	—	Telemann Portal; Catalogue TWV
TVWV 21	Germanicus	TVWV 21:129	Voi ch'e terni in ciel giedete	S solo with recorder, 2 oboes, 2 bassoons, 2 horns, 2 violins, viola, cello and continuo	—	Telemann Portal; Catalogue TWV
TVWV 21	Germanicus	TVWV 21:130	Sei nicht betrubt, ich scheide zwar von dir	S solo with recorder, 2 oboes, 2 bassoons, 2 horns, 2 violins, viola, cello and continuo	—	Telemann Portal; Catalogue TWV
TVWV 21	Germanicus	TVWV 21:131	Mein susser Trost, mein einziges Verlangen	SA with recorder, 2 oboes, 2 bassoons, 2 horns, 2 violins, viola, cello and continuo	—	Telemann Portal; Catalogue TWV
TVWV 21	Germanicus	TVWV 21:132	Zur Flucht, mein Schatz	SB with recorder, 2 oboes, 2 bassoons, 2 horns, 2 violins, viola, cello and continuo	—	Telemann Portal; Catalogue TWV
TVWV 21	Germanicus	TVWV 21:133	Die Bosheit soll ablassen	T solo with recorder, 2 oboes, 2 bassoons, 2 horns, 2 violins, viola, cello and continuo	—	Telemann Portal; Catalogue TWV
TVWV 21	Germanicus	TVWV 21:134	Nun kann ich endlich doch einmal	S solo with recorder, 2 oboes, 2 bassoons, 2 horns, 2 violins, viola, cello and continuo	—	Telemann Portal; Catalogue TWV
TVWV 21	Germanicus	TVWV 21:135	Zu euch, ihr barmherzigen Sterne, fliehe ich	S solo with recorder, 2 oboes, 2 bassoons, 2 horns, 2 violins, viola, cello and continuo	—	Telemann Portal; Catalogue TWV
TVWV 21	Germanicus	TVWV 21:136	Stelle innique, ingrate stelle	B solo with recorder, 2 oboes, 2 bassoons, 2 horns, 2 violins, viola, cello and continuo	—	Telemann Portal; Catalogue TWV
TVWV 21	Germanicus	TVWV 21:137	Barbara perfida senza pieta	B solo with recorder, 2 oboes, 2 bassoons, 2 horns, 2 violins, viola, cello and continuo	—	Telemann Portal; Catalogue TWV
TVWV 21	—	TVWV 21:138	Klagest du nach meiner Rache	S solo with recorder, 2 oboes, 2 bassoons, 2 horns, 2 violins, viola, cello and continuo	—	Telemann Portal; Catalogue TWV
TVWV 21	—	TVWV 21:139	Die syrische Unruh oder Die beleidigte Liebe	S solo with recorder, 2 oboes, 2 bassoons, 2 horns, 2 violins, viola, cello and continuo	= TVWV 20:75, TVWV 21:113	Telemann Portal; Catalogue TWV
TVWV 21	Germanicus	TVWV 21:140	Sei zufrieden schonste Seele	S solo with recorder, 2 oboes, 2 bassoons, 2 horns, 2 violins, viola, cello and continuo	—	Telemann Portal; Catalogue TWV
TVWV 21	Germanicus	TVWV 21:141	Wie glucklich ist die Brust	SA with recorder, 2 oboes, 2 bassoons, 2 horns, 2 violins, viola, cello and continuo	—	Telemann Portal; Catalogue TWV
TVWV 21	Germanicus	TVWV 21:142	Ewig werd ich dich verehren	A solo with recorder, 2 oboes, 2 bassoons, 2 horns, 2 violins, viola, cello and continuo	—	Telemann Portal; Catalogue TWV
TVWV 21	Germanicus	TVWV 21:143	Amor, dein verhauster Bogen	S solo with recorder, 2 oboes, 2 bassoons, 2 horns, 2 violins, viola, cello and continuo	—	Telemann Portal; Catalogue TWV
TVWV 21	Germanicus	TVWV 21:144	Zög're nicht, geliebtes Leben	ST solo with continuo	—	Telemann Portal; Catalogue TWV
TVWV 21	Germanicus	TVWV 21:145	Du nennst mich ungerecht	B solo with continuo	—	Telemann Portal; Catalogue TWV
TVWV 21	—	TVWV 21:146	Sei zufrieden, meine Seele	S solo with continuo	—	Telemann Portal; Catalogue TWV
TVWV 21	—	TVWV 21:147	Ich will vergnügt mein Leben schließen	B solo with continuo	—	Telemann Portal; Catalogue TWV
TVWV 21	—	TVWV 21:148	Könnt ich den Geliebten sehn	S solo with continuo	—	Telemann Portal; Catalogue TWV
TVWV 21	—	TVWV 21:149	Ich will dir's nur gestehen	B solo with continuo	—	Telemann Portal; Catalogue TWV
TVWV 21	—	TVWV 21:150	Komm, Geliebter, komm zur Liebe	S solo with continuo	—	Telemann Portal; Catalogue TWV
TVWV 21	—	TVWV 21:151	Antwortet doch, ihr schönsten Lippen	S solo with continuo	—	Telemann Portal; Catalogue TWV
TVWV 21	—	TVWV 21:152	Süße Hoffnung, sag es mir	B solo with continuo	—	Telemann Portal; Catalogue TWV
TVWV 21	—	TVWV 21:153	Ihr holden Augen meiner Schönen	B solo with continuo	—	Telemann Portal; Catalogue TWV
TVWV 21	—	TVWV 21:154	Himmel, führe meine Sache	B solo, 2 oboes, 2 violins, viola, cello and continuo	—	Telemann Portal; Catalogue TWV

=== TVWV 22 – Contributions to operas by other composers ===
Section	Catalogue	Title	Scoring	Opera	URL
TVWV 22	TVWV 22:1	So erhalt getreue Liebe	SA with 2 violins and basso continuo	Ulysses, by G.M. Orlandini	Telemann Portal; Catalogue TWV
TVWV 22	TVWV 22:2	Intermezzo; Aria nº 6	—	Tamerlano, by G.F. Händel	Telemann Portal; Catalogue TWV
TVWV 22	TVWV 22:3	(14 arias)	STB with flute, 2 oboes, bassoon, 2 violins, viola, cello and basso continuo	Otto, by G.F. Händel	Telemann Portal; Catalogue TWV
TVWV 22	TVWV 22:4	Maggior pendie tut tele Lascia mia bella Tintendo si mio cor	SA with basso continuo	Syphax, by Nicolo Porpora	Telemann Portal; Catalogue TWV
TVWV 22	TVWV 22:5	Ihr krachenden Grufte; Ihr Blitze dar blinkenden Klingen; Ihr knallenden Schlage; Die Wolken zeugen Blitz und Kelle	SB with trumpet, 2 violins, viola, cello, concertante cello and basso continuo	Masagniello furioso oder Die neapolitanische Fischer-Empörung, by Reinhold Keiser	Telemann Portal; Catalogue TWV
TVWV 22	TVWV 22:6	Ouverture; Vernunft, Geduld und Zeit; Stirbt mein Geist durch drin Verlangen	S with 2 violins, viola, cello and basso continuo	Der gestürzte und wieder erhöhte Nebukadnezar, by Reinhold Keiser	Telemann Portal; Catalogue TWV
TVWV 22	TVWV 22:7	Fliessen nichts ala bittre Tranen	S with 2 flutes, 2 violins, viola, cello and basso continuo	Der bei dem allgemeinen Weltfrieden von dem großen Augustus geschlossene Tempel des Janus, by Reinhold Keiser	Telemann Portal; Catalogue TWV
TVWV 22	TVWV 22:8	—	—	Der misslungene Brautwechsel oder Richardus I., König von England, by G.F. Händel	Telemann Portal; Catalogue TWV
TVWV 22	TVWV 22:9	—	—	Ernelinda, by G.M. Orlandini	Telemann Portal; Catalogue TWV
TVWV 22	TVWV 22:10	Agitatae l'alma mia della temae	S and basso continuo	Der Streit der kindlichen Pflicht und der Liebe oder Die Flucht des Aeneas nach Latien, by Nicolo Porpora	Telemann Portal; Catalogue TWV
TVWV 22	TVWV 22:11	—	—	Der Triumph der Großmut und Treue oder Cleofida, Königin von Indien, by G.F. Händel	Telemann Portal; Catalogue TWV
TVWV 22	TVWV 22:12	Ich kusse die Hand mit anmutsvollen Trieben; Auch lass dich doch mein Mehn erweichen Der teuren Mutter klugen Willen	S with unison instruments and basso continuo	Judith, Gemahlin Kaiser Ludewigs des Frommen oder Die siegende Unschuld, By Fortunato Chelleri	Telemann Portal; Catalogue TWV
TVWV 22	TVWV 22:13	Quillt, ihr uberhauften Tranen	S with unison instruments and basso continuo	Der in Kronen erlangte Glücks-Wechsel oder Almira, Königin von Kastilien, by G.F. Händel	Telemann Portal; Catalogue TWV

=== TVWV 23 – Prologues for operas ===
Section	Catalogue	Title	Scoring	Occasion	Observation	URL
TVWV 23	TVWV 23:1	Spirti amanti, festeggiate	—	Wedding of Louis XV and Maria	Not Preserved	Telemann Portal; Catalogue TWV
TVWV 23	TVWV 23:2	Die Opera ist tot! Die Schmerzen, die uns rühren	—	New presentation of opera characters	Not Preserved	Telemann Portal; Catalogue TWV
TVWV 23	TVWV 23:3	Zum Preisen, zum Singen, zur Feier, auf, auf!	—	Birthday of King George Louis of Britain	Not Preserved	Telemann Portal; Catalogue TWV
TVWV 23	TVWV 23:4	Auf zum Jauchzen! Auf zur Lust!	—	Birth of King Louis XV's twins	Not Preserved	Telemann Portal; Catalogue TWV
TVWV 23	TVWV 23:5	Jauchze, frohlocke für Wollust, für Freuden	—	Coronation celebrations of King George II and Wilhelmine Caroline	Not Preserved	Telemann Portal; Catalogue TWV
TVWV 23	TVWV 23:6	Muntre Trompeten, geschlängelte Hörner	—	—	Not Preserved	Telemann Portal; Catalogue TWV
TVWV 23	TVWV 23:7	Ihr Schatten stiller Einsamkeiten	—	—	Not Preserved	Telemann Portal; Catalogue TWV
TVWV 23	TVWV 23:8	Zu den Waffen! zu den Waffen!	—	—	Not Preserved	Telemann Portal; Catalogue TWV
TVWV 23	TVWV 23:9	Frohlocket, ihr Musen/Völker/Helden	—	—	Not Preserved	Telemann Portal; Catalogue TWV
TVWV 23	TVWV 23:10	Indem ihr euch anitzt mit Tanz und Spiel ergetzt	—	—	Not Preserved	Telemann Portal; Catalogue TWV
TVWV 23	TVWV 23:11	Lasst uns so früh nicht auseinander eilen	—	—	Not Preserved	Telemann Portal; Catalogue TWV
TVWV 23	TVWV 23:12	Auf Freunde! Auf zur Lust!	S solo with 2 violins, viola, cello and continuo	—	—	Telemann Portal; Catalogue TWV

=== TVWV 24 – Secular oratorios ===
Section	Catalogue	Title	Scoring	Observation	URL
TVWV 24	TVWV 24:1	Unschätzbarer Vorwurf erkenntlicher Sinnen	SATB with 2 piccolo flutes, pastoral flute, 2 transverse flutes, 2 oboes, oboe d'amore, 2 bassoons, 3 bugles, 3 hunting horns, timpani, 2 violins, viola, cello and continuo	Music for the anniversary of the Admiralty of Hamburg (1723)	Telemann Portal; Catalogue TWV
TVWV 24	TVWV 24:2	Hamburg steht und blüht im Segen	—	Serenade for a State Banquet in Hamburg (1724); Not Conserved	Telemann Portal; Catalogue TWV
TVWV 24	TVWV 24:3	Musik zur 100-Jahrfeier des Collegiums der Oberalten	—	—	Telemann Portal; Catalogue TWV
TVWV 24	TVWV 24:3a	Freuet euch, ihr Ober-Alten	—	Oratorium for the 200th anniversary of the Ober-Alten College of the State of Hamburg (Reformed - 1728); Not Conserved	Catalogue TWV
TVWV 24	TVWV 24:3b	Das angenehme Nieder-Sachsen trägt itzt	—	Serenade for the 200th anniversary of the Ober-Alten College of the State of Hamburg (Reformation - 1728); Not Conserved	Catalogue TWV
TVWV 24	TVWV 24:4	Sei von uns mit weiten Blicken	—	Anniversary party of the Hamburg College of Commerce (1765)	Telemann Portal; Catalogue TWV
TVWV 24	TVWV 24:5	Durch des Krieges Trutz und Macht	B solo with violin and continuo	Fragment; composition for a "Kaufmannschaft" (merchants' guild)	Telemann Portal; Catalogue TWV

=== TVWV 25 – Pedagogical works, odes and songs ===
Section	Grouping	Catalogue	Title	Scoring	Observation	URL
TVWV 25	Singende Geographie	TVWV 25:1	Kommt zu lernen mit Belieben	Voice with continuo	—	Telemann Portal; Catalogue TWV
TVWV 25	Singende Geographie	TVWV 25:2	Europa, zeige mir dein Bild	Voice with continuo	—	Telemann Portal; Catalogue TWV
TVWV 25	Singende Geographie	TVWV 25:3	Portugal neben Algarbien	Voice with continuo	—	Telemann Portal; Catalogue TWV
TVWV 25	Singende Geographie	TVWV 25:4	Mitten liegt in Spanien	Voice with continuo	—	Telemann Portal; Catalogue TWV
TVWV 25	Singende Geographie	TVWV 25:5	Die Schweiz hat die Kantones	Voice with continuo	—	Telemann Portal; Catalogue TWV
TVWV 25	Singende Geographie	TVWV 25:6	Welschland oben um den Po	Voice with continuo	—	Telemann Portal; Catalogue TWV
TVWV 25	Singende Geographie	TVWV 25:7	Was lieget mitten ein?	Voice with continuo	—	Telemann Portal; Catalogue TWV
TVWV 25	Singende Geographie	TVWV 25:8	Guyenne, Languedoc, Provence	Voice with continuo	—	Telemann Portal; Catalogue TWV
TVWV 25	Singende Geographie	TVWV 25:9	Auf, auf, es gehet nach Provence	Voice with continuo	—	Telemann Portal; Catalogue TWV
TVWV 25	Singende Geographie	TVWV 25:10	Das Land hier teilt man in Lothringen	Voice with continuo	—	Telemann Portal; Catalogue TWV
TVWV 25	Singende Geographie	TVWV 25:11	Kent, Essex, Sussex und Westsexia	Voice with continuo	—	Telemann Portal; Catalogue TWV
TVWV 25	Singende Geographie	TVWV 25:12	Lothiana, Tivedal, Eskdal	Voice with continuo	—	Telemann Portal; Catalogue TWV
TVWV 25	Singende Geographie	TVWV 25:13	Die nach Niederland hinwandern	Voice with continuo	—	Telemann Portal; Catalogue TWV
TVWV 25	Singende Geographie	TVWV 25:14	In Niederland, das man sonst spanisch nennet	Voice with continuo	—	Telemann Portal; Catalogue TWV
TVWV 25	Singende Geographie	TVWV 25:15	Wer will Deutschland tüchtig wissen	Voice with continuo	—	Telemann Portal; Catalogue TWV
TVWV 25	Singende Geographie	TVWV 25:16	Österreich zerteilt die Enns	Voice with continuo	—	Telemann Portal; Catalogue TWV
TVWV 25	Singende Geographie	TVWV 25:17	Die Städte, die man itzt in Bayern hat	Voice with continuo	—	Telemann Portal; Catalogue TWV
TVWV 25	Singende Geographie	TVWV 25:18	Wer erklärt mir die Gedanken?	Voice with continuo	—	Telemann Portal; Catalogue TWV
TVWV 25	Singende Geographie	TVWV 25:19	Nun besuchet unsre Reise in dem oberrhein'schen Kreise	Voice with continuo	—	Telemann Portal; Catalogue TWV
TVWV 25	Singende Geographie	TVWV 25:20	Zum westfälischen Kreise	Voice with continuo	—	Telemann Portal; Catalogue TWV
TVWV 25	Singende Geographie	TVWV 25:21	Niedersachsen hat elf Stücke	Voice with continuo	—	Telemann Portal; Catalogue TWV
TVWV 25	Singende Geographie	TVWV 25:22	Kur-Hannover, dein Gebiete singet mein erfreut Gemüte	Voice with continuo	—	Telemann Portal; Catalogue TWV
TVWV 25	Singende Geographie	TVWV 25:23	Alfeld, Gronau, Elze	Voice with continuo	—	Telemann Portal; Catalogue TWV
TVWV 25	Singende Geographie	TVWV 25:24	Nunmehr gehet unsre Reise	Voice with continuo	—	Telemann Portal; Catalogue TWV
TVWV 25	Singende Geographie	TVWV 25:25	Prager, Slaner, Rakonitzer	Voice with continuo	—	Telemann Portal; Catalogue TWV
TVWV 25	Singende Geographie	TVWV 25:26	Lasst uns singen, lasst uns reden auch von Skandinavia	Voice with continuo	—	Telemann Portal; Catalogue TWV
TVWV 25	Singende Geographie	TVWV 25:27	Schweden, wenn wir's in der Eile	Voice with continuo	—	Telemann Portal; Catalogue TWV
TVWV 25	Singende Geographie	TVWV 25:28	Wer will Moskau mit mir fassen	Voice with continuo	—	Telemann Portal; Catalogue TWV
TVWV 25	Singende Geographie	TVWV 25:29	Krakau, Sandomir, Lublin sind es	Voice with continuo	—	Telemann Portal; Catalogue TWV
TVWV 25	Singende Geographie	TVWV 25:30	In Ober-Ungarn, da wo Polen lieget	Voice with continuo	—	Telemann Portal; Catalogue TWV
TVWV 25	Singende Geographie	TVWV 25:31	Die Walachei muss noch den Türken dienen	Voice with continuo	—	Telemann Portal; Catalogue TWV
TVWV 25	Singende Geographie	TVWV 25:32	In Asia macht die Türkei den Schwanz	Voice with continuo	—	Telemann Portal; Catalogue TWV
TVWV 25	Singende Geographie	TVWV 25:33	Der Schwanz ist groß und hat Natolien	Voice with continuo	—	Telemann Portal; Catalogue TWV
TVWV 25	Singende Geographie	TVWV 25:34	Was Afrika anlangt, so sind drei Winkel	Voice with continuo	—	Telemann Portal; Catalogue TWV
TVWV 25	Singende Geographie	TVWV 25:35	Ich frage nunmehr noch zum Spaße	Voice with continuo	—	Telemann Portal; Catalogue TWV
TVWV 25	Singende Geographie	TVWV 25:36	Nun senket euch, ihr Masten	Voice with continuo	—	Telemann Portal; Catalogue TWV
TVWV 25	—	TVWV 25:37	Das Frauenzimmer verstimmt sich immer	S solo with flute, violin and continuo	Aria from "Der getreue Musikmeister"	Telemann Portal; Catalogue TWV
TVWV 25	—	TVWV 25:38	Säume nicht, geliebte Schöne	S solo with flute, violin and continuo	Aria from "Der getreue Musikmeister"	Telemann Portal; Catalogue TWV
TVWV 25	Singe-Spiel-und Generalbass-Ubungen	TVWV 25:39	Etwas Neues vorzutragen	Voice with continuo	—	Telemann Portal; Catalogue TWV
TVWV 25	Singe-Spiel-und Generalbass-Ubungen	TVWV 25:40	Die größte Kunst ist, Geld zu machen	Voice with continuo	—	Telemann Portal; Catalogue TWV
TVWV 25	Singe-Spiel-und Generalbass-Ubungen	TVWV 25:41	Wo bleibt ihr denn, ihr guten Tage?	Voice with continuo	—	Telemann Portal; Catalogue TWV
TVWV 25	Singe-Spiel-und Generalbass-Ubungen	TVWV 25:42	Ein Stand, der ohn Gefahr ist	Voice with continuo	—	Telemann Portal; Catalogue TWV
TVWV 25	Singe-Spiel-und Generalbass-Ubungen	TVWV 25:43	Magst du, was meine Fehler sind	Voice with continuo	—	Telemann Portal; Catalogue TWV
TVWV 25	Singe-Spiel-und Generalbass-Ubungen	TVWV 25:44	Der Himmel lässt nach langem Weinen	Voice with continuo	—	Telemann Portal; Catalogue TWV
TVWV 25	Singe-Spiel-und Generalbass-Ubungen	TVWV 25:45	Ich habe manchmal nachgedacht	Voice with continuo	—	Telemann Portal; Catalogue TWV
TVWV 25	Singe-Spiel-und Generalbass-Ubungen	TVWV 25:46	Die Nacht muss in die Fremde wandern	Voice with continuo	—	Telemann Portal; Catalogue TWV
TVWV 25	Singe-Spiel-und Generalbass-Ubungen	TVWV 25:47	Ach! schreiet Dorilis, was hat mich doch betroffen	Voice with continuo	—	Telemann Portal; Catalogue TWV
TVWV 25	Singe-Spiel-und Generalbass-Ubungen	TVWV 25:48	Die Erde trinket selbst den Regen und den Schnee	Voice with continuo	—	Telemann Portal; Catalogue TWV
TVWV 25	Singe-Spiel-und Generalbass-Ubungen	TVWV 25:49	Mein Glücke trag' ich in der Taschen	Voice with continuo	—	Telemann Portal; Catalogue TWV
TVWV 25	Singe-Spiel-und Generalbass-Ubungen	TVWV 25:50	Ein reiches Weib verschafft Bequemlichkeit	Voice with continuo	—	Telemann Portal; Catalogue TWV
TVWV 25	Singe-Spiel-und Generalbass-Ubungen	TVWV 25:51	Man frage Phillis einst	Voice with continuo	—	Telemann Portal; Catalogue TWV
TVWV 25	Singe-Spiel-und Generalbass-Ubungen	TVWV 25:52	Ein Schäfer pflegt in reinen Quellen	Voice with continuo	—	Telemann Portal; Catalogue TWV
TVWV 25	Singe-Spiel-und Generalbass-Ubungen	TVWV 25:53	Ihr Leute, die ihr auf den Reisen	Voice with continuo	—	Telemann Portal; Catalogue TWV
TVWV 25	Singe-Spiel-und Generalbass-Ubungen	TVWV 25:54	Mehr wett' ich nicht als hundert Taler	Voice with continuo	—	Telemann Portal; Catalogue TWV
TVWV 25	Singe-Spiel-und Generalbass-Ubungen	TVWV 25:55	Sein Diener! ei, das lautet fein	Voice with continuo	—	Telemann Portal; Catalogue TWV
TVWV 25	Singe-Spiel-und Generalbass-Ubungen	TVWV 25:56	Wie weislich tut, wer seine Schuh	Voice with continuo	—	Telemann Portal; Catalogue TWV
TVWV 25	Singe-Spiel-und Generalbass-Ubungen	TVWV 25:57	In der Ruh vergnügter Sinnen	Voice with continuo	—	Telemann Portal; Catalogue TWV
TVWV 25	Singe-Spiel-und Generalbass-Ubungen	TVWV 25:58	Geliebter Frühling meiner Tage	Voice with continuo	—	Telemann Portal; Catalogue TWV
TVWV 25	Singe-Spiel-und Generalbass-Ubungen	TVWV 25:59	Geht schlafen, geht! macht Feierabend	Voice with continuo	—	Telemann Portal; Catalogue TWV
TVWV 25	Singe-Spiel-und Generalbass-Ubungen	TVWV 25:60	Kann man das Vorzugsrecht bloß von viel Ahnen hoffen	Voice with continuo	—	Telemann Portal; Catalogue TWV
TVWV 25	Singe-Spiel-und Generalbass-Ubungen	TVWV 25:61	Hebt mich kein geneigter Wind	Voice with continuo	—	Telemann Portal; Catalogue TWV
TVWV 25	Singe-Spiel-und Generalbass-Ubungen	TVWV 25:62	Du stiller Ort geliebter Einsamkeit	Voice with continuo	—	Telemann Portal; Catalogue TWV
TVWV 25	Singe-Spiel-und Generalbass-Ubungen	TVWV 25:63	Soll man sonder Anstoß ruhen	Voice with continuo	—	Telemann Portal; Catalogue TWV
TVWV 25	Singe-Spiel-und Generalbass-Ubungen	TVWV 25:64	Es herrschet in der Welt die Falschheit aller Orten	Voice with continuo	—	Telemann Portal; Catalogue TWV
TVWV 25	Singe-Spiel-und Generalbass-Ubungen	TVWV 25:65	Der Geizhals träget keine Scheu	Voice with continuo	—	Telemann Portal; Catalogue TWV
TVWV 25	Singe-Spiel-und Generalbass-Ubungen	TVWV 25:66	Schalle nur, du munt're Flöte	Voice with continuo	—	Telemann Portal; Catalogue TWV
TVWV 25	Singe-Spiel-und Generalbass-Ubungen	TVWV 25:67	Wind macht aus Toren kluge Leute	Voice with continuo	—	Telemann Portal; Catalogue TWV
TVWV 25	Singe-Spiel-und Generalbass-Ubungen	TVWV 25:68	Was hilft es, wenn das Silber blitzt	Voice with continuo	—	Telemann Portal; Catalogue TWV
TVWV 25	Singe-Spiel-und Generalbass-Ubungen	TVWV 25:69	Du rühmst nicht ohne Grund	Voice with continuo	—	Telemann Portal; Catalogue TWV
TVWV 25	Singe-Spiel-und Generalbass-Ubungen	TVWV 25:70	Auf den bunt beblümten Feldern	Voice with continuo	—	Telemann Portal; Catalogue TWV
TVWV 25	Singe-Spiel-und Generalbass-Ubungen	TVWV 25:71	Das Glücke kömmt selten per Posta zu Pferde	Voice with continuo	—	Telemann Portal; Catalogue TWV
TVWV 25	Singe-Spiel-und Generalbass-Ubungen	TVWV 25:72	Wer will, mag in den Lüften fliegen	Voice with continuo	—	Telemann Portal; Catalogue TWV
TVWV 25	Singe-Spiel-und Generalbass-Ubungen	TVWV 25:73	Wie glücklich ist der Mensch	Voice with continuo	—	Telemann Portal; Catalogue TWV
TVWV 25	Singe-Spiel-und Generalbass-Ubungen	TVWV 25:74	Es ist die Mäßigkeit die Mutter aller Tugend	Voice with continuo	—	Telemann Portal; Catalogue TWV
TVWV 25	Singe-Spiel-und Generalbass-Ubungen	TVWV 25:75	Wie manchen hat die Wahl betrogen	Voice with continuo	—	Telemann Portal; Catalogue TWV
TVWV 25	Singe-Spiel-und Generalbass-Ubungen	TVWV 25:76	Die Lieb' und auch die Flöh' sind oft von einer Art	Voice with continuo	—	Telemann Portal; Catalogue TWV
TVWV 25	Singe-Spiel-und Generalbass-Ubungen	TVWV 25:77	In allen Lexicis, in allen Wörter-Büchern	Voice with continuo	—	Telemann Portal; Catalogue TWV
TVWV 25	Singe-Spiel-und Generalbass-Ubungen	TVWV 25:78	Crispino, sage doch	Voice with continuo	—	Telemann Portal; Catalogue TWV
TVWV 25	Singe-Spiel-und Generalbass-Ubungen	TVWV 25:79	Die Freundschaft dieser Welt	Voice with continuo	—	Telemann Portal; Catalogue TWV
TVWV 25	Singe-Spiel-und Generalbass-Ubungen	TVWV 25:80	Ragonda folgte gern	Voice with continuo	—	Telemann Portal; Catalogue TWV
TVWV 25	Singe-Spiel-und Generalbass-Ubungen	TVWV 25:81	O Heiliger, dein Ruhm geht billig an die Sterne	Voice with continuo	—	Telemann Portal; Catalogue TWV
TVWV 25	Singe-Spiel-und Generalbass-Ubungen	TVWV 25:82	Wie mancher nähret sich von nicht erlaubten Sachen	Voice with continuo	—	Telemann Portal; Catalogue TWV
TVWV 25	Singe-Spiel-und Generalbass-Ubungen	TVWV 25:83	Dort seh' ich einen grauen Mann	Voice with continuo	—	Telemann Portal; Catalogue TWV
TVWV 25	Singe-Spiel-und Generalbass-Ubungen	TVWV 25:84	Es hat mir noch an keiner Lust gefehlt	Voice with continuo	—	Telemann Portal; Catalogue TWV
TVWV 25	Singe-Spiel-und Generalbass-Ubungen	TVWV 25:85	Ich will vor meiner Türe kehren	Voice with continuo	—	Telemann Portal; Catalogue TWV
TVWV 25	Odes	TVWV 25:86	Ihr Freunde! zecht bei freudenvollen Chören	Voice with continuo	—	Telemann Portal; Catalogue TWV
TVWV 25	Odes	TVWV 25:87	Gönnt mir doch das bisschen Freude	Voice with continuo	—	Telemann Portal; Catalogue TWV
TVWV 25	Odes	TVWV 25:88	Vergebens verlässt mich das Glücke	Voice with continuo	—	Telemann Portal; Catalogue TWV
TVWV 25	Odes	TVWV 25:89	An dieser schattenreichen Linde	Voice with continuo	—	Telemann Portal; Catalogue TWV
TVWV 25	Odes	TVWV 25:90	Gott der Träume, Freund der Nacht	Voice with continuo	—	Telemann Portal; Catalogue TWV
TVWV 25	Odes	TVWV 25:91	Hört doch nur, ihr gelben Raben	Voice with continuo	—	Telemann Portal; Catalogue TWV
TVWV 25	Odes	TVWV 25:92	Wer sich ohne Stolz erhebt	Voice with continuo	—	Telemann Portal; Catalogue TWV
TVWV 25	Odes	TVWV 25:93	Lasset euch vergnügen	Voice with continuo	—	Telemann Portal; Catalogue TWV
TVWV 25	Odes	TVWV 25:94	Auf! fordre von dem besten Wein	Voice with continuo	—	Telemann Portal; Catalogue TWV
TVWV 25	Odes	TVWV 25:95	Bei dem mittelmäß'gen Stande	Voice with continuo	—	Telemann Portal; Catalogue TWV
TVWV 25	Odes	TVWV 25:96	Plagt euch mit Verdruss, ihr Toren	Voice with continuo	—	Telemann Portal; Catalogue TWV
TVWV 25	Odes	TVWV 25:97	Freund und Labsal aller Brüder	Voice with continuo	—	Telemann Portal; Catalogue TWV
TVWV 25	Odes	TVWV 25:98	Sollt' auch ich durch Gram und Leid	Voice with continuo	—	Telemann Portal; Catalogue TWV
TVWV 25	Odes	TVWV 25:99	Ich bin kein Freund von vielen Speisen	Voice with continuo	—	Telemann Portal; Catalogue TWV
TVWV 25	Odes	TVWV 25:100	Nun lern' ich erst dein Herze kennen	Voice with continuo	—	Telemann Portal; Catalogue TWV
TVWV 25	Odes	TVWV 25:101	Recht so, Freunde, brauchet ihr	Voice with continuo	—	Telemann Portal; Catalogue TWV
TVWV 25	Odes	TVWV 25:102	Auf! ihr unverdross'nen Brüder	Voice with continuo	—	Telemann Portal; Catalogue TWV
TVWV 25	Odes	TVWV 25:103	Bei dem schlechten Schäferstande	Voice with continuo	—	Telemann Portal; Catalogue TWV
TVWV 25	Odes	TVWV 25:104	Ja, erforscht nur, werte Brüder	Voice with continuo	—	Telemann Portal; Catalogue TWV
TVWV 25	Odes	TVWV 25:105	Ich kann mirs leicht gefallen lassen	Voice with continuo	—	Telemann Portal; Catalogue TWV
TVWV 25	Odes	TVWV 25:106	Ihr Brüder, trinkt mit frohem Mut	Voice with continuo	—	Telemann Portal; Catalogue TWV
TVWV 25	Odes	TVWV 25:107	Freunde, gönnet mir die Lust	Voice with continuo	—	Telemann Portal; Catalogue TWV
TVWV 25	Odes	TVWV 25:108	Nein! nie verlass' ich eure Ruh	Voice with continuo	—	Telemann Portal; Catalogue TWV
TVWV 25	Odes	TVWV 25:109	Ihr wollet mich zum Freunde wählen	Voice with continuo	—	Telemann Portal; Catalogue TWV
TVWV 25	—	TVWV 25:110	Muffel singt zu ganzen Tagen	S solo with continuo	Melody included in an ode	Telemann Portal; Catalogue TWV
TVWV 25	—	TVWV 25:111	Heraclid gleicht stumpfen Greisen	S solo with continuo	Melody included in an ode	Telemann Portal; Catalogue TWV
TVWV 25	—	TVWV 25:112	Amor sagte zu Cythere	S solo with continuo	Melody included in an ode	Telemann Portal; Catalogue TWV
TVWV 25	—	TVWV 25:113	Bartholomeus	ATB with continuo	—	Telemann Portal; Catalogue TWV
TVWV 25	—	TVWV 25:114	Der Noten und des Glückes Lauf	—	Six-part canon for the students of Lüneburg (1735)	Telemann Portal; Catalogue TWV

== See also ==
- Telemann-Werke-Verzeichnis (TWV)
- List of instrumental works by Georg Philipp Telemann (TWV)
