= Art Nouveau religious buildings =

Art Nouveau temples are churches, chapels, synagogues, and mosques built in the style known as Art Nouveau in French and English languages (also Modern Style or Glasgow style in the latter one), Jugendstil in Germany and Nordic countries, Secessionsstil in countries of former Austro-Hungary, Modernisme in Catalan, Modern in Russian, Stile Liberty or Stile Floreale in Italian. As National Romantic style is also referred to Art Nouveau, churches of that style are also listed here, as well as some temples not of pure Art Nouveau style but with distinctive Art Nouveau features. Art Nouveau religious buildings often included stained glass as major decorative pieces, highlighting the broader role of colored glass in the movements growth across Europe. The focus on stained glass also made colored light a key element of the interior atmosphere of these religious structures going forward.

== Art Nouveau churches of Spain ==
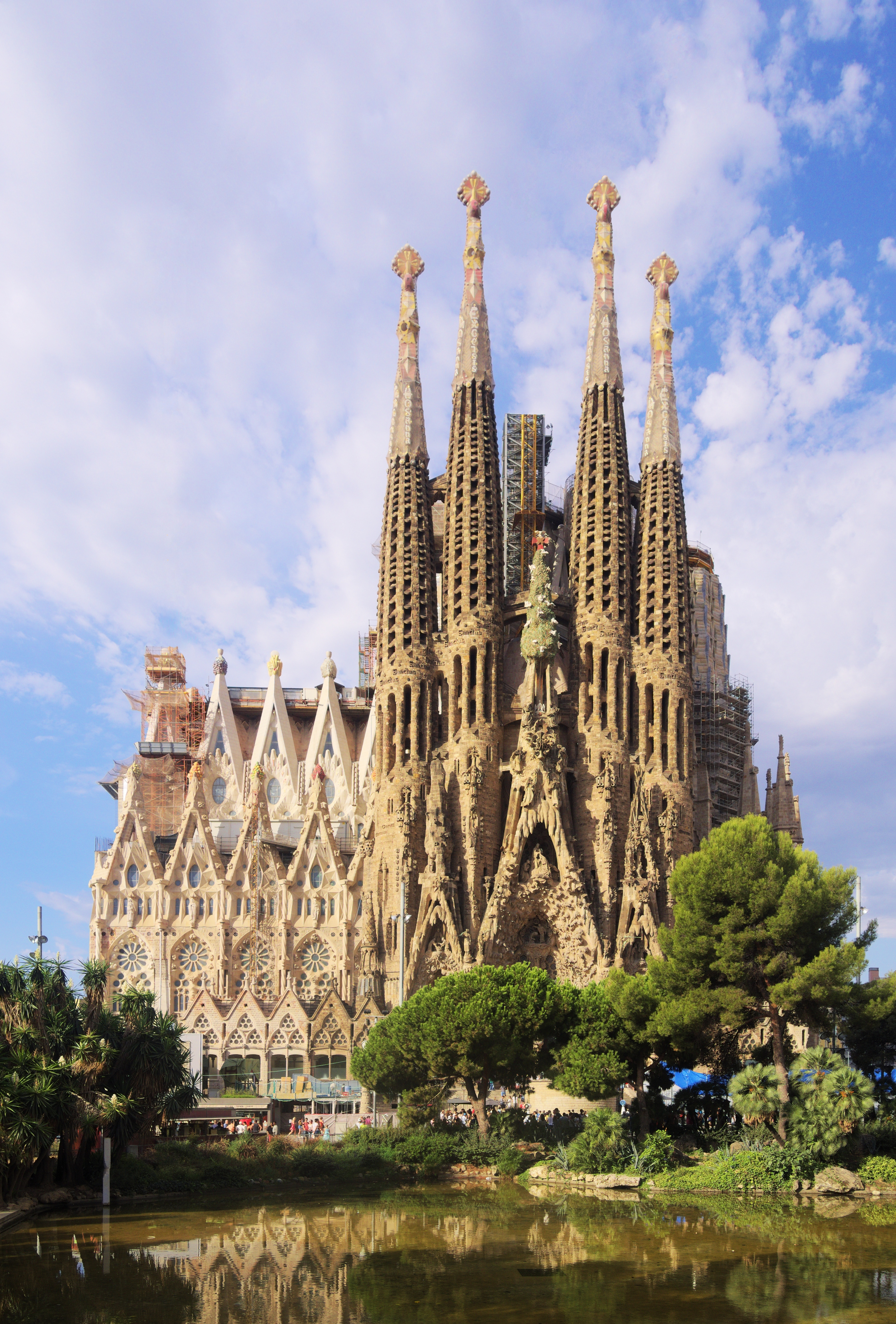
Nativity Façade of Sagrada Família basilica in Barcelona

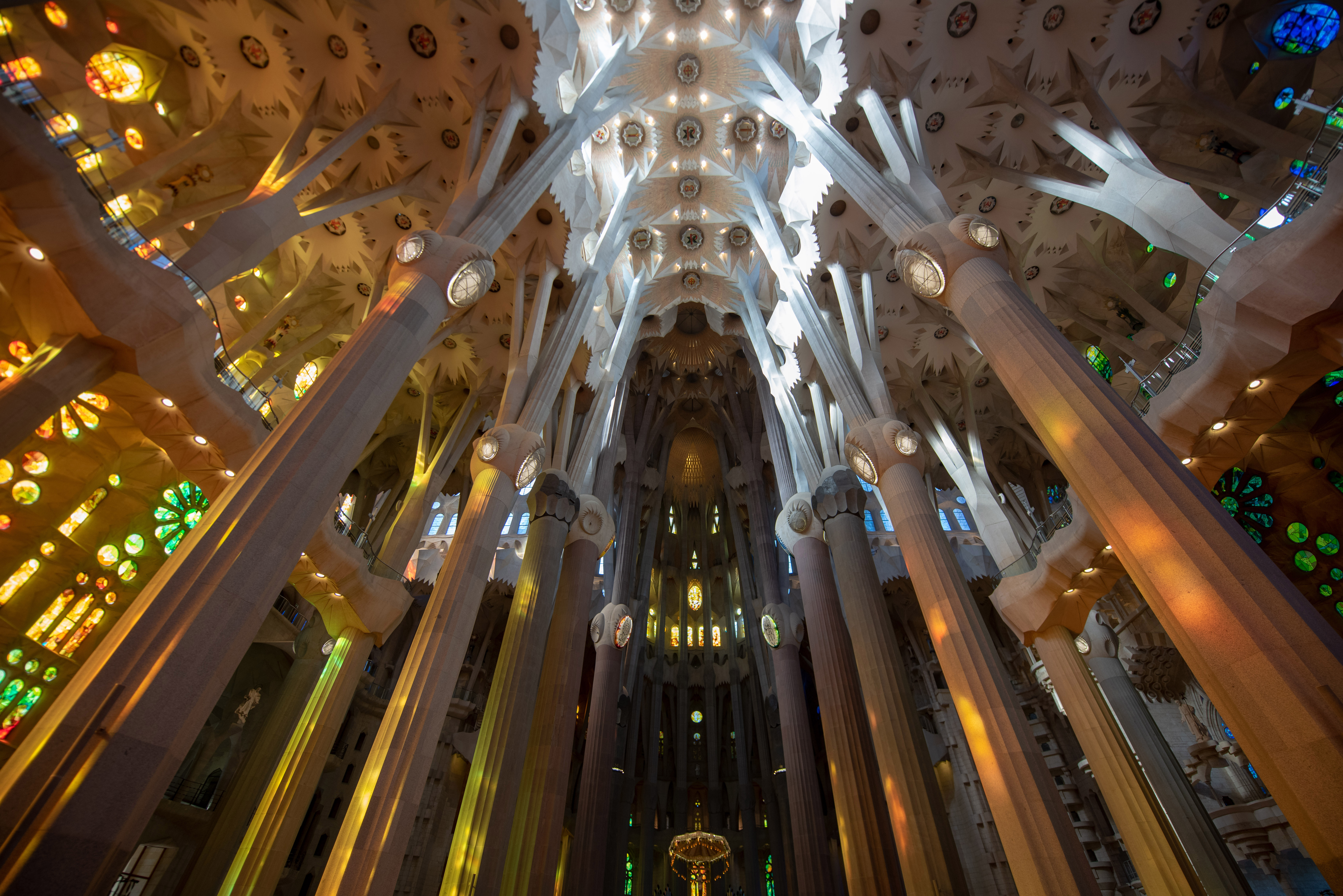
Interior of Sagrada Família basilica in Barcelona

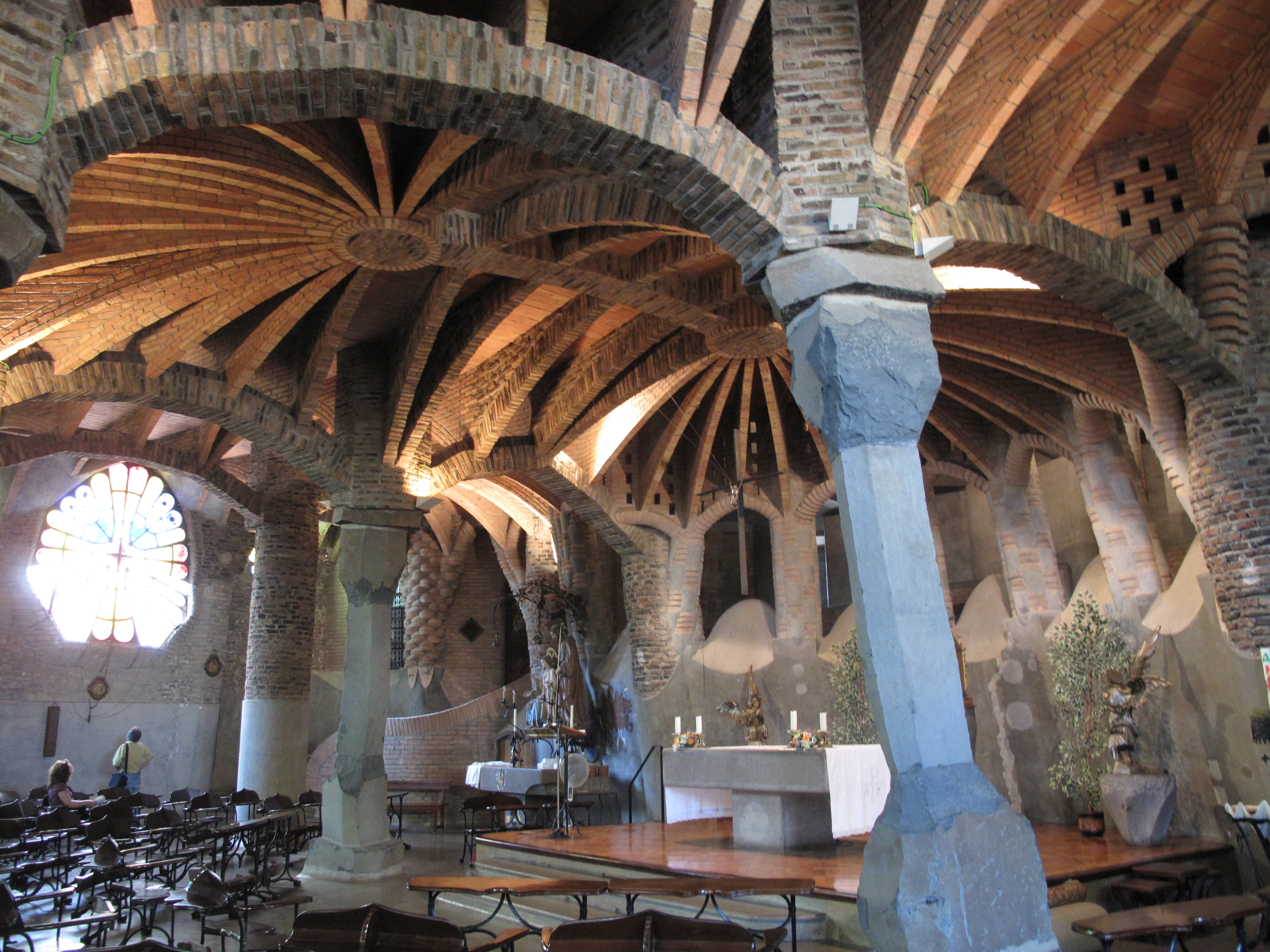
Interior of Church of Colònia Güell in Santa Coloma de Cervelló, province of Barcelona

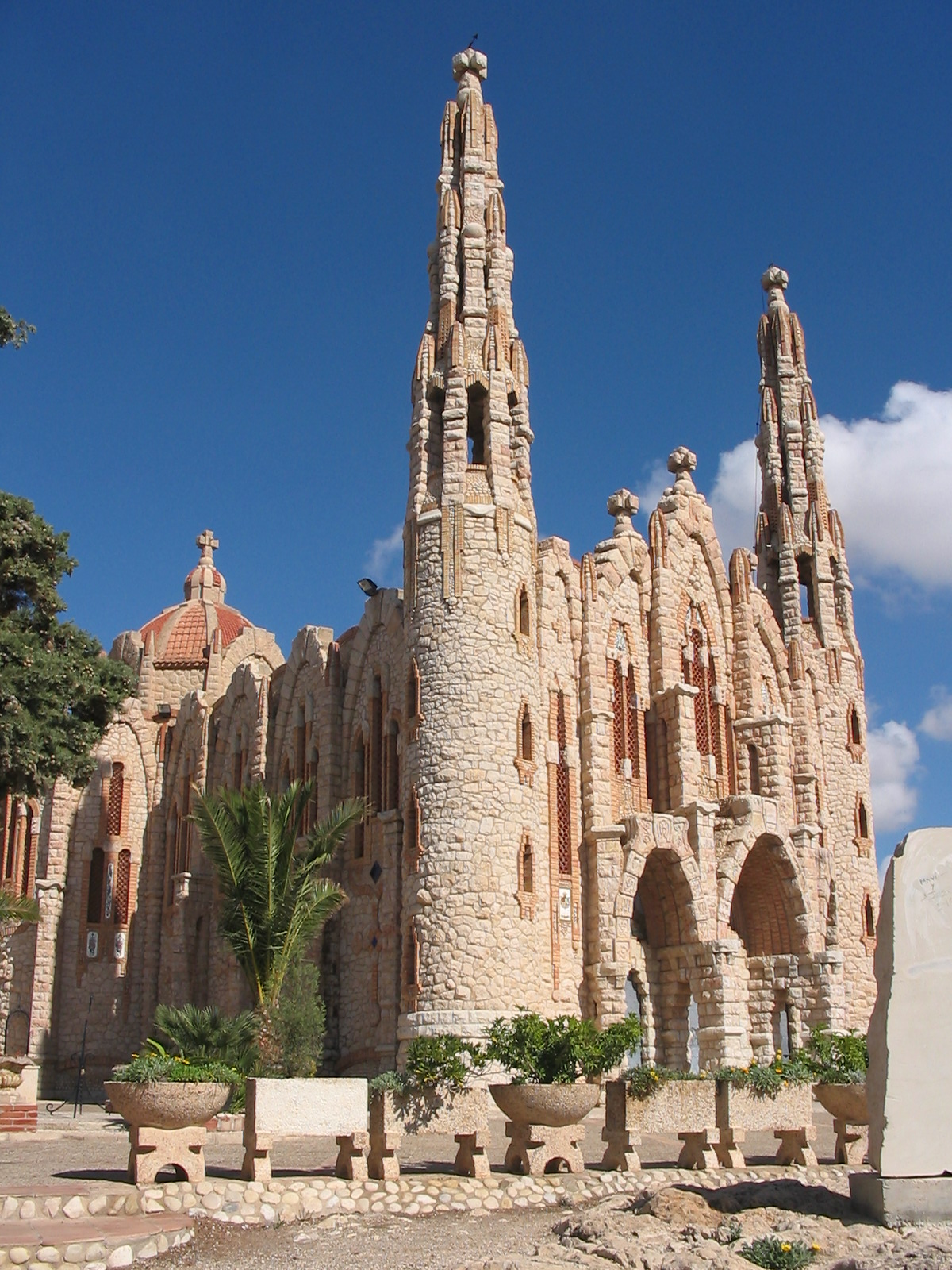
Sanctuary of Maria Magdalena in Novelda

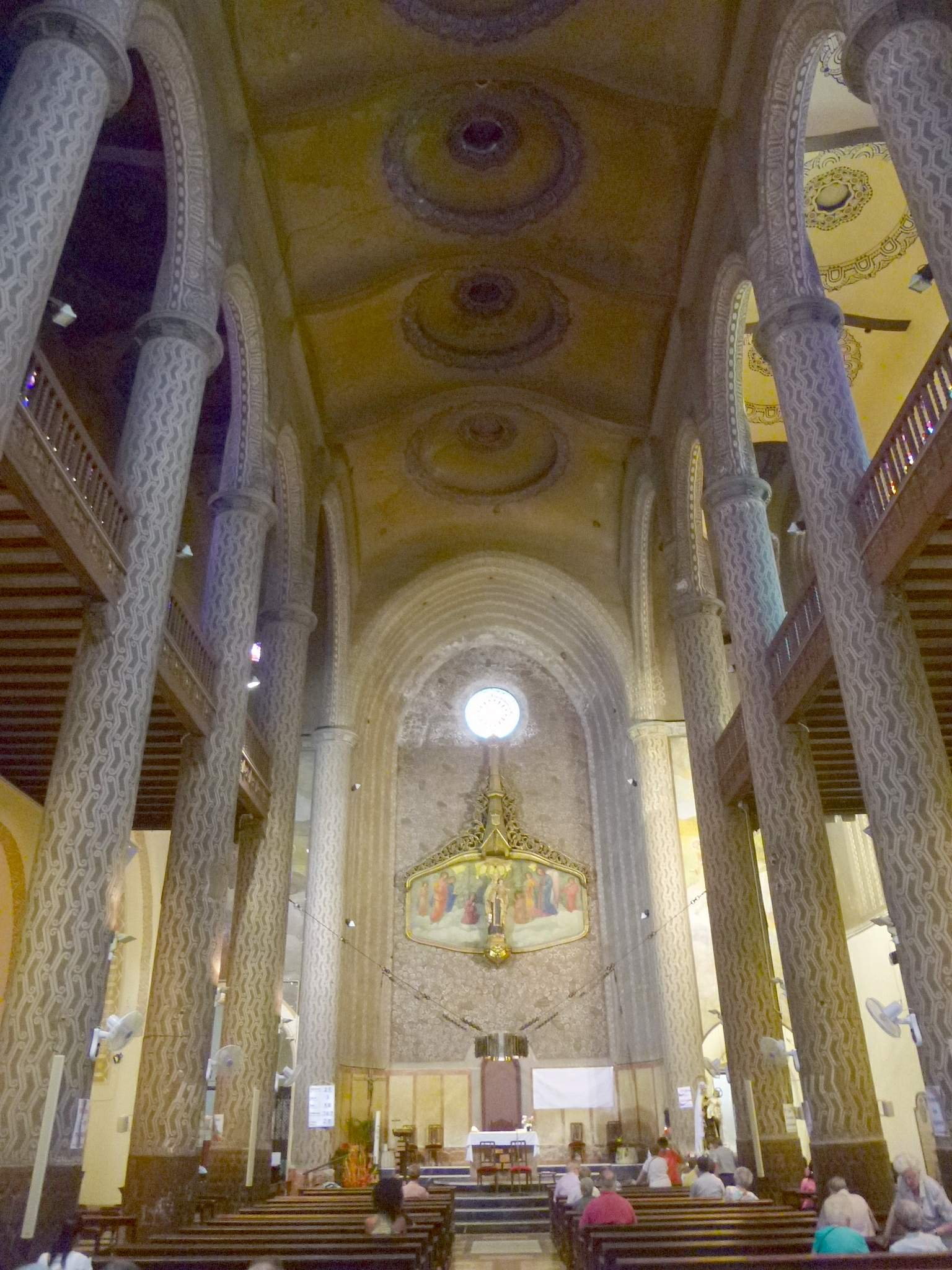
Interior of the Carmen church (1911-1913) in Barcelona

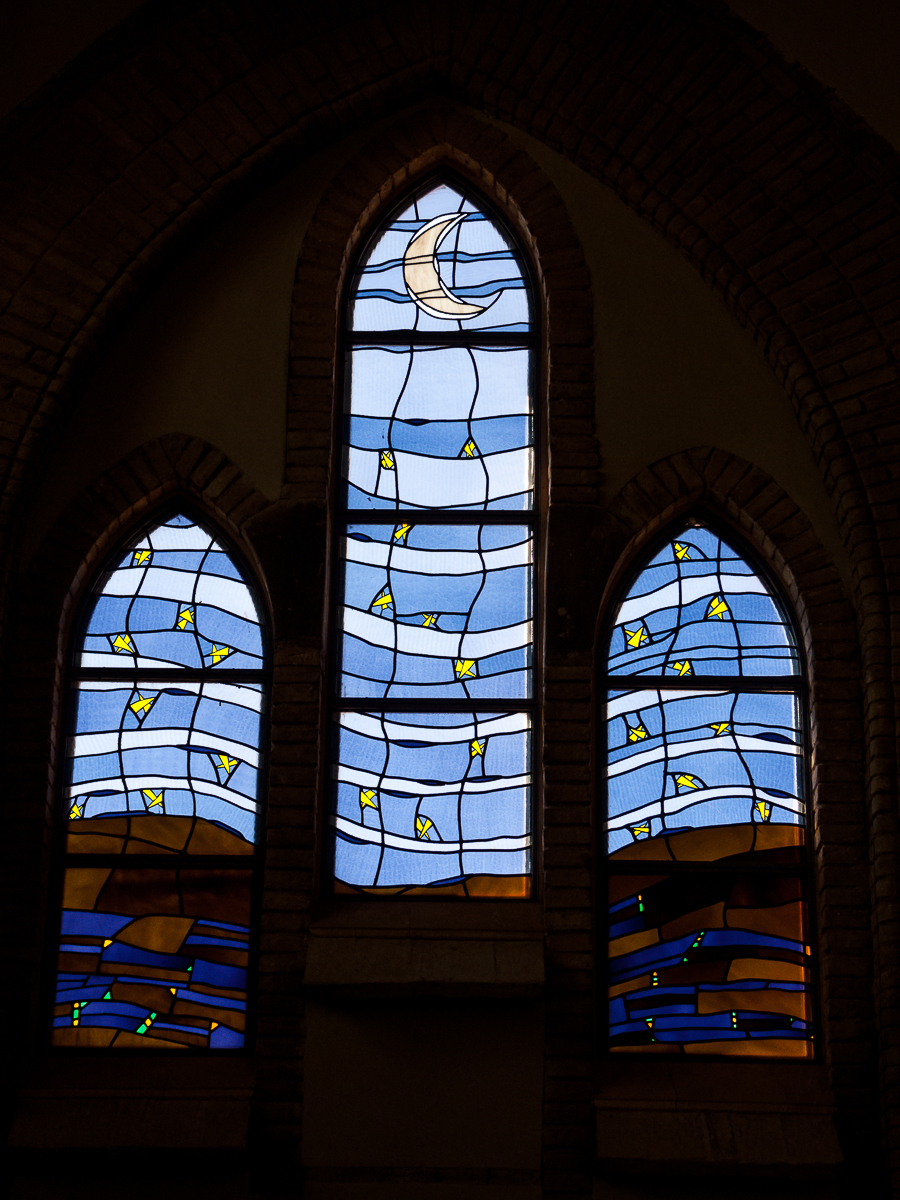
The stained glass windows of the Christ church in Province of Teruel

The country of Spain contains some of the most prominent examples of Art Nouveau religious architecture, specifically in Catalonia, where the style developed into a Catalan form of Art Nouveau, Catalan Modernism. The variant style was recognized for its decorative detail, curved form, and strong connection to Catalan culture.

The only religious buildings recognized as UNESCO World Heritage Sites are works by Antoni Gaudí. Basilica i Temple Expiatori de la Sagrada Familia, commonly known as Sagrada Família, in Barcelona, begun in 1882 and is still under construction along with the Church of Colònia Güell in Santa Coloma de Cervelló, which was left unfinished in 1914 by Gaudí and other Spanish architects Francesc Berenguer i Mestres, and Joan Rubió.

Sagrada Família is not pure Art Nouveau: its construction started before the movement incepted with a Neo-Gothic design by Francisco de Paula del Villar, of which only the crypt was built. Francisco de Paula del Villar resigned in 1883 and the project was rebuilt by Gaudí.

Sagrada Família was a vague inspiration for the construction of Sanctuary of Maria Magdalena by José Sala Sala in Novelda of the Catalan-speaking Valencian Community. Though the construction started in 1918 and finished in 1946, this church is regarded as a valuable monument of Valencian Art Nouveau.

Another example of a Modernisme church in Catalonia is the Carmen church (1911-1913) in Barcelona by Josep Maria Pericas, an example of modernisme church by a Catalan architect in another part of Spain – the Christ church (1910-1912) in the Province of Teruel by Pau Monguió i Segura.

== Art Nouveau churches of France ==
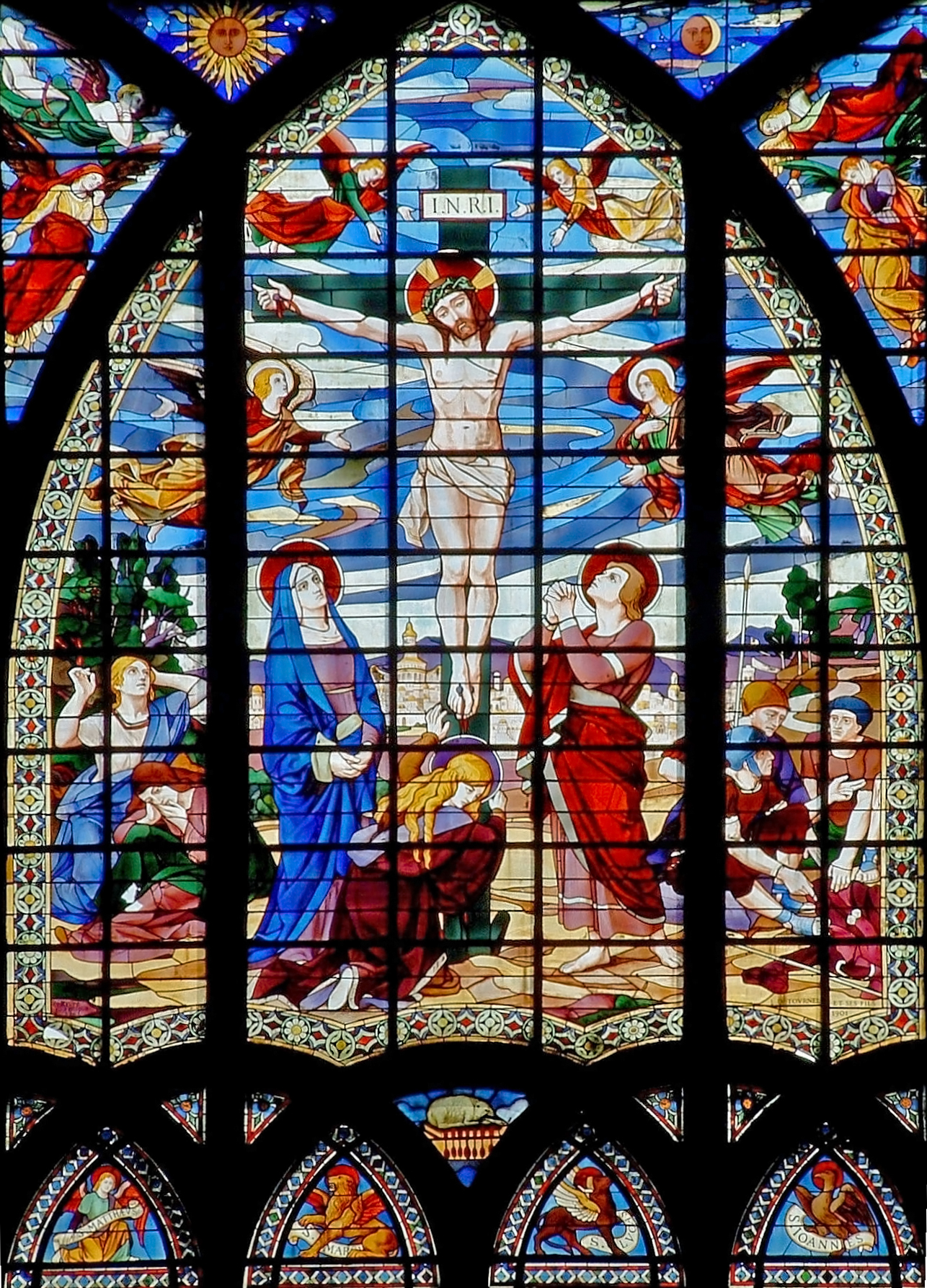
The stained glass window of Saint-Jean-de-Montmartre in Paris

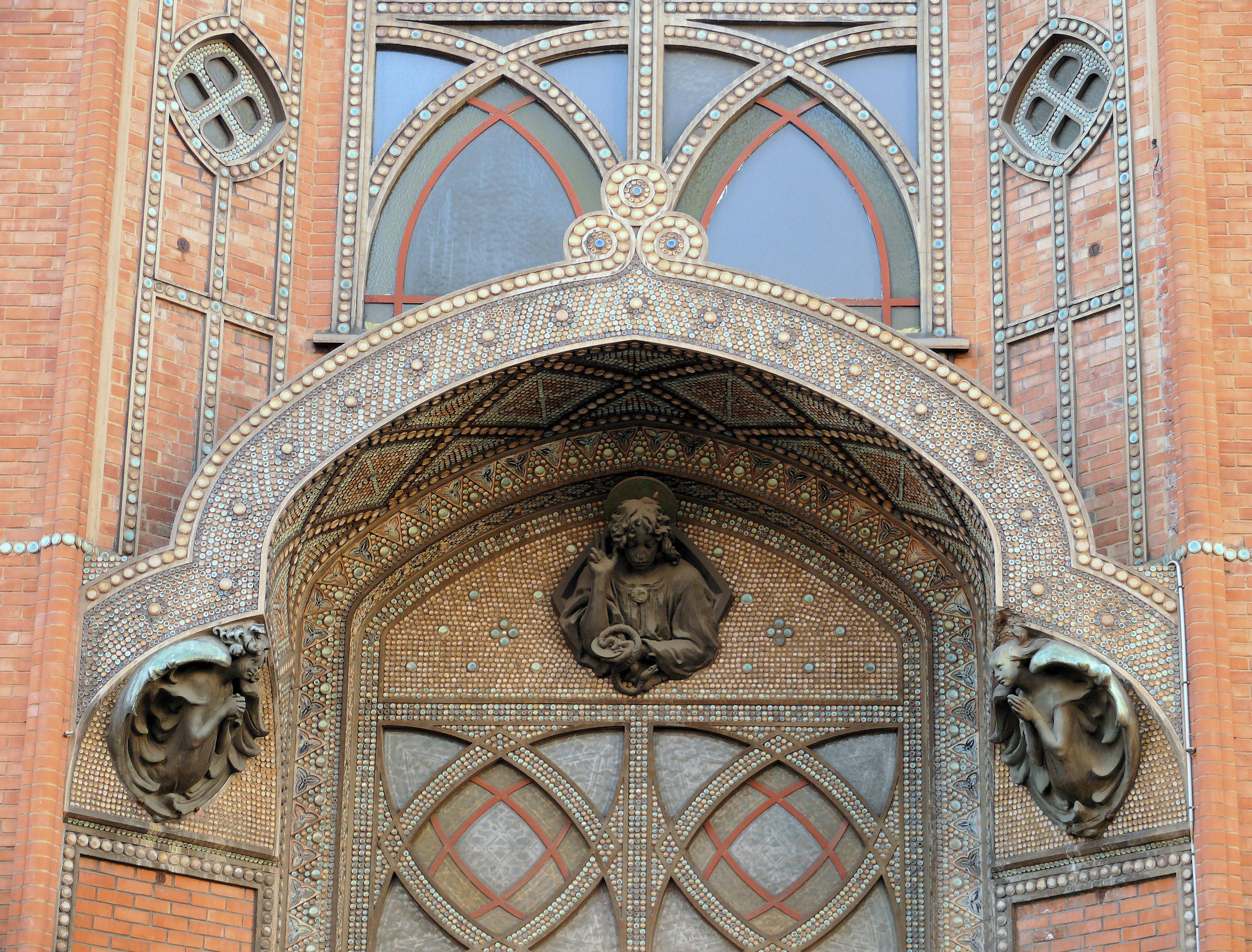
Ceramics of Alexandre Bigot with sculptures by Pierre Roche at Saint-Jean-de-Montmartre, Paris

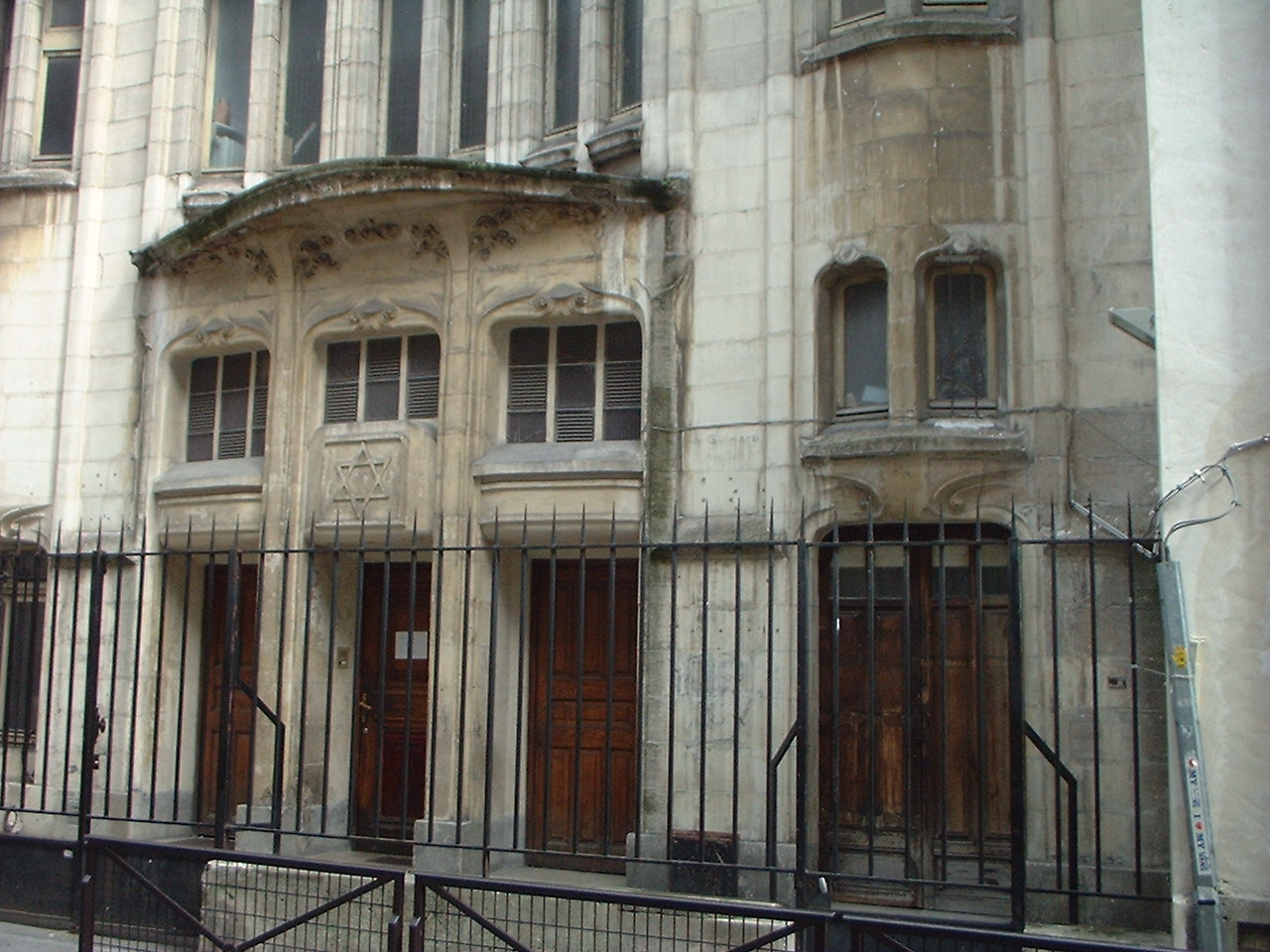
Portal of Agoudas Hakehilos Synagogue by Hector Guimard in Paris

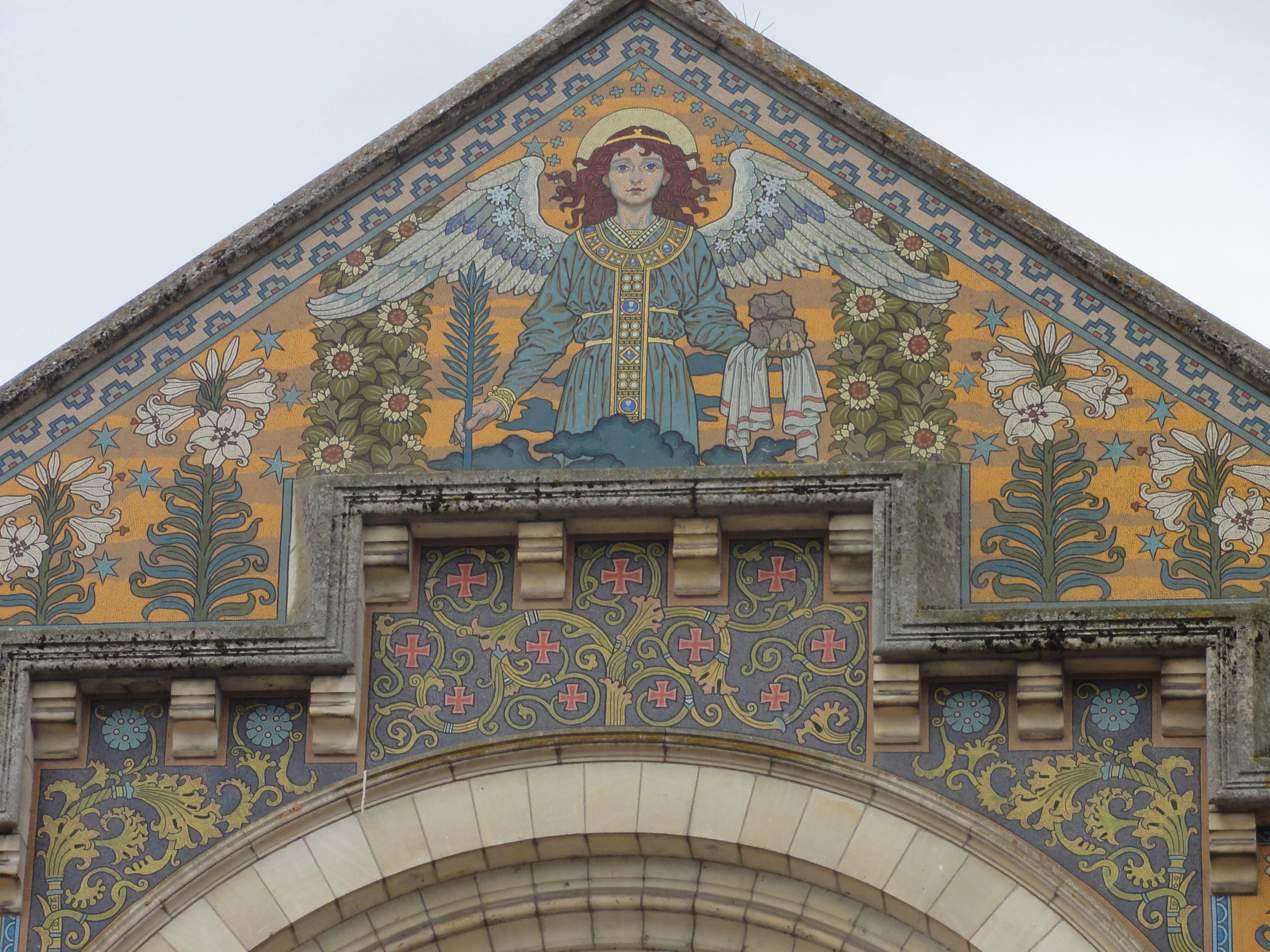
Mosaic of Saint-Étienne church by Eugène Grasset in Briare

The church of Saint-Jean-de-Montmartre in Paris (1894-1904) was designed by architect Anatole de Baudot with stained glass windows executed by Jac Galland according to the design of Ernest-Pascal Blanchard, bronze interior sculptures by Pierre Roche, and ceramic tiles by Alexandre Bigot. The reinforced concrete structure followed a system developed by the engineer Paul Cottancin.

Another Art Nouveau religious building in Paris is Agoudas Hakehilos Synagogue (1913-1914) by Hector Guimard, who was not only the architect, but also created furnishings (luminaires, chandeliers, brackets, and benches), as well as the stylized vegetal decorations and the cast iron railings.

An Art Nouveau artist Eugène Grasset designed mosaics and stained glass windows (done by Félix Gaudin) for Saint-Étienne church (1890-1895) in Briare, Centre-Val de Loire.

== Art Nouveau churches of the British Empire ==
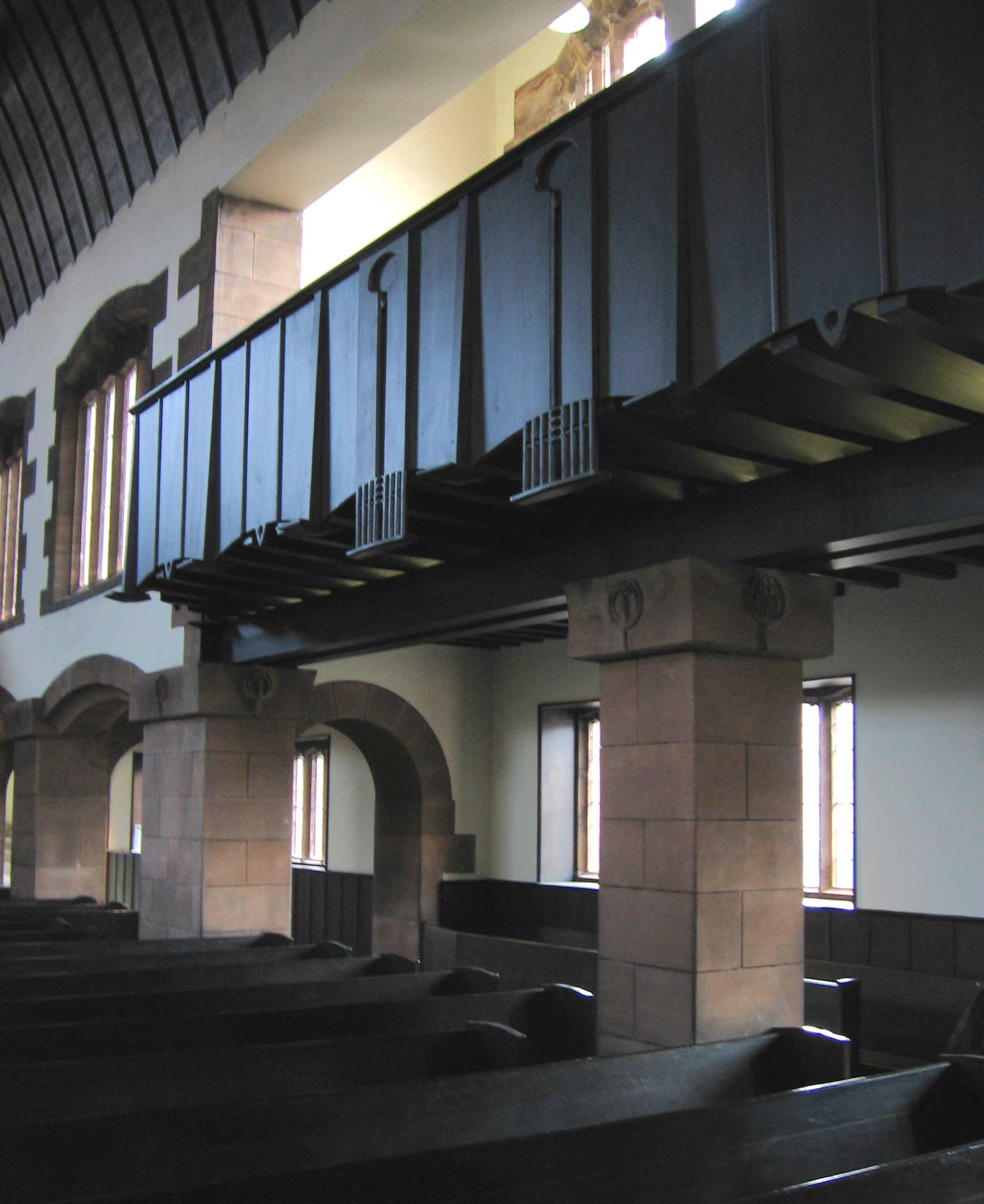
Interior of Queen's Cross Church by Charles Rennie Mackintosh in Glasgow, Scotland

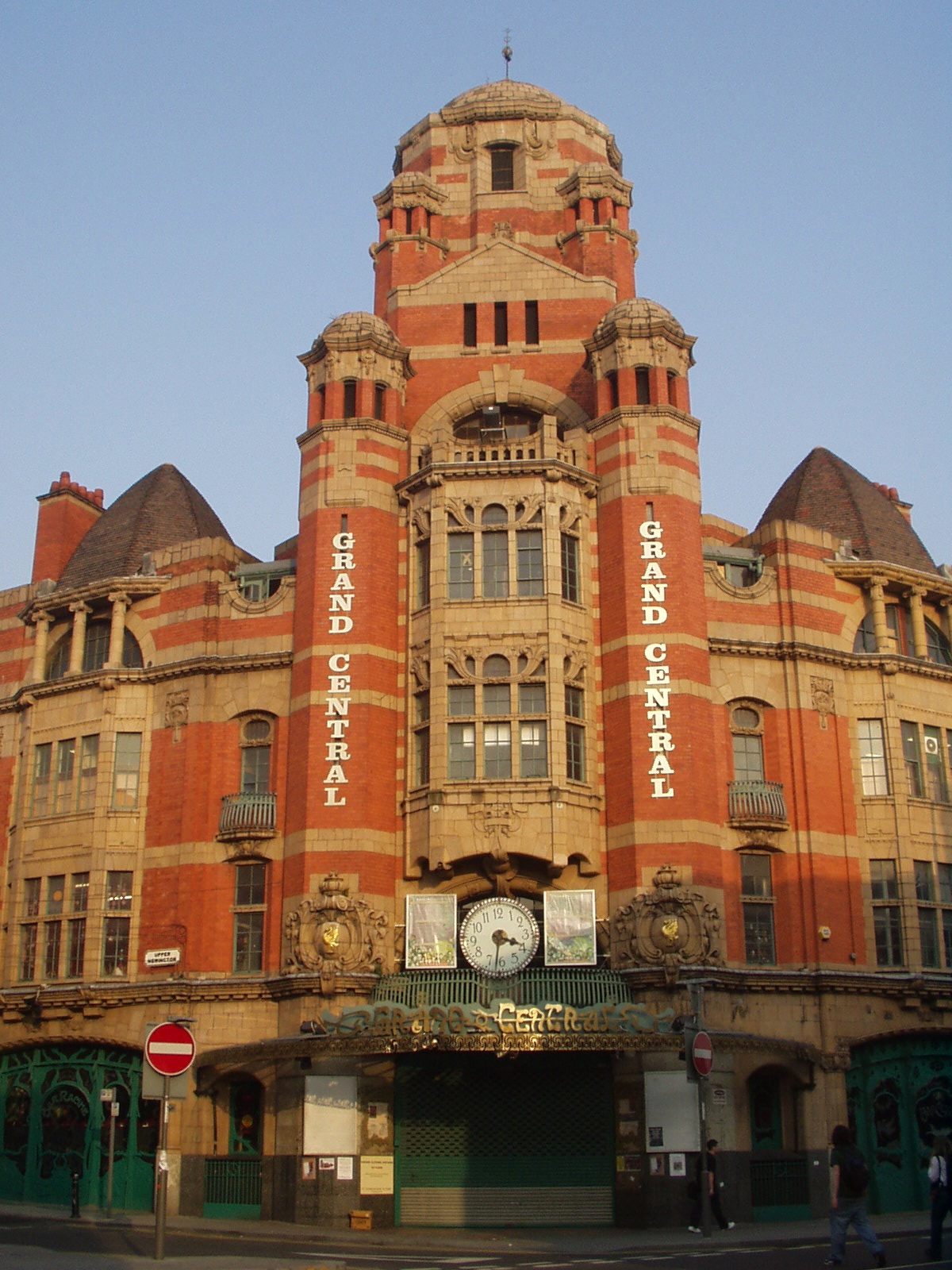
Former Methodist church by Bradshaw and Gass in Liverpool

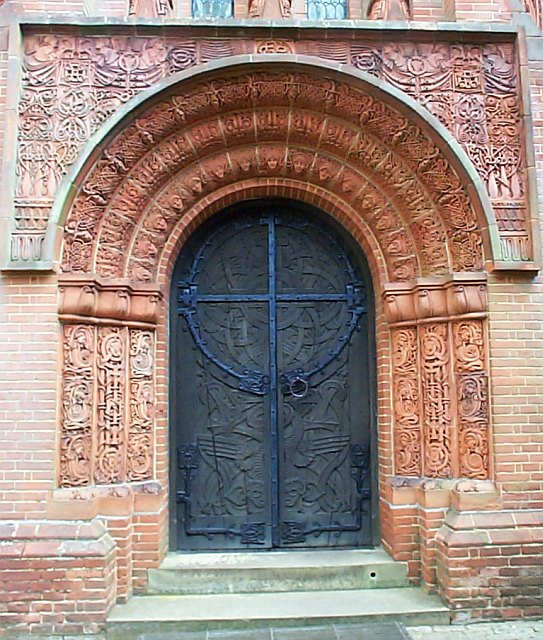
Portal of Watts Cemetery Chapel by Mary Fraser-Tytler in Compton, Surrey

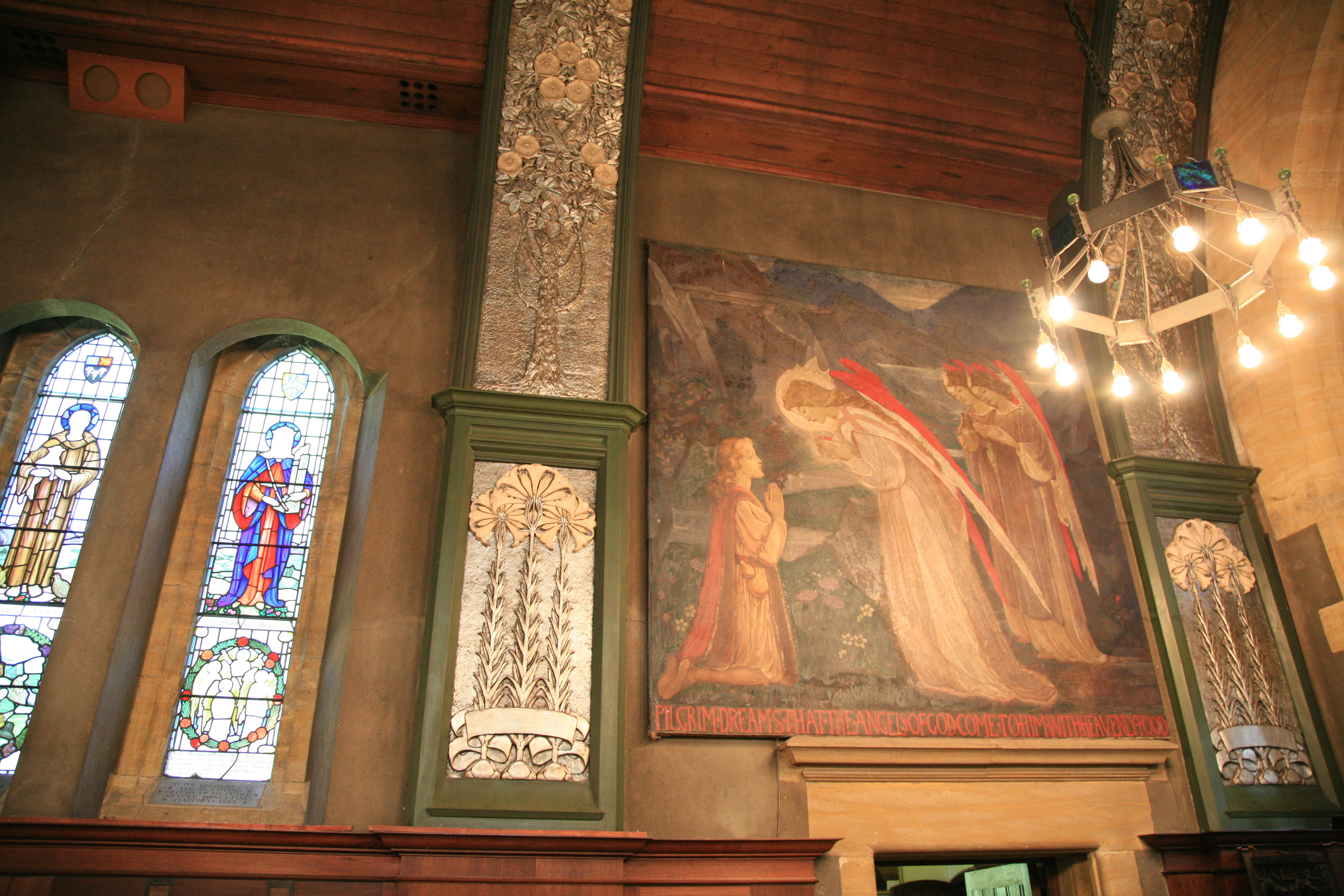
Interior of St. Mary the Virgin church by Sir William Reynolds-Stephens in Great Warley, Essex

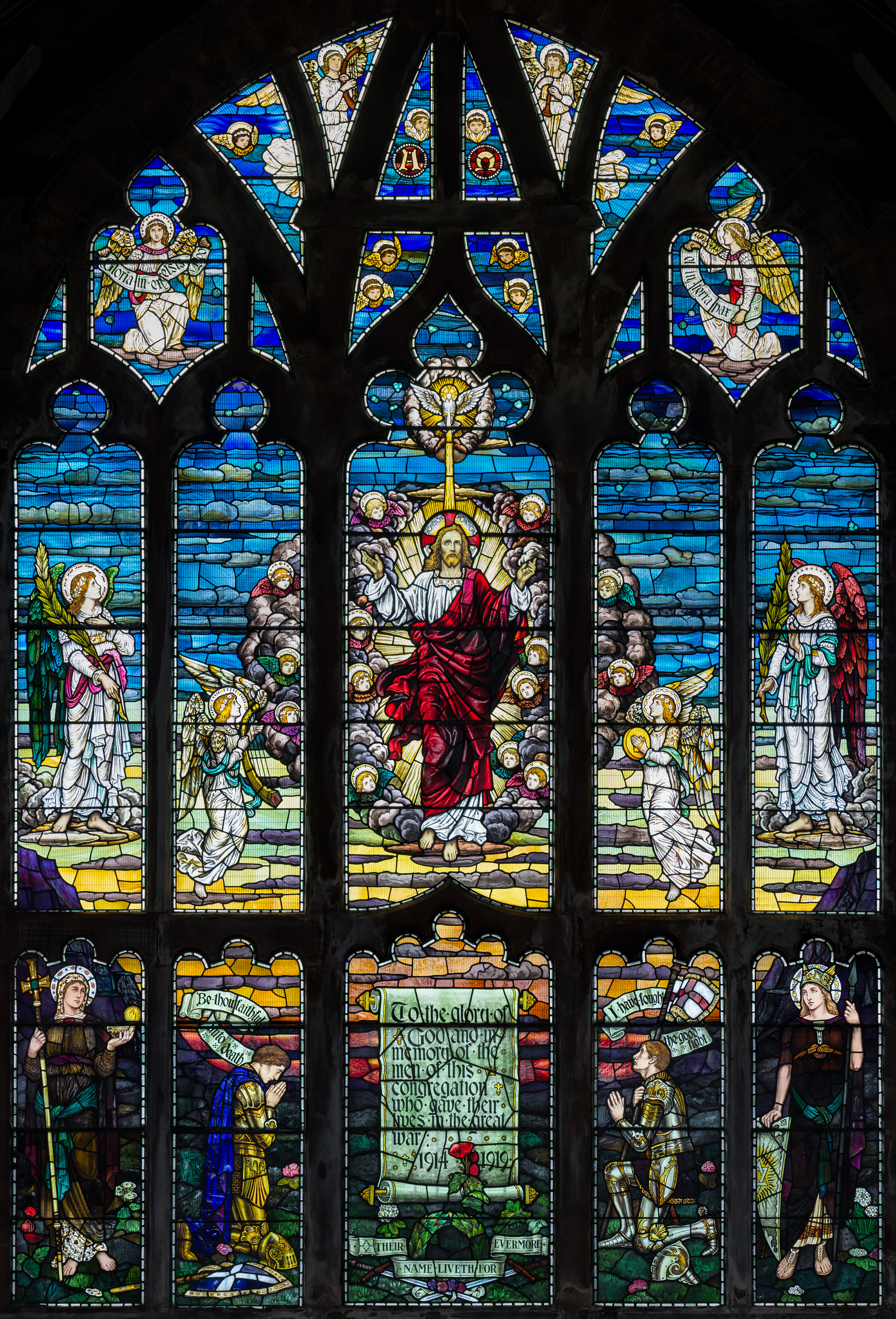
The stained glass window of St Matthew's Church by Robert Anning Bell in Paisley, Scotland

The only actually built church of the pioneer of Glasgow style Charles Rennie Mackintosh is the Queen's Cross Church (1898-1899) in Glasgow. An Art Nouveau design by Bradshaw and Gass had a former Methodist church (1905) in Liverpool now hosting the Grand Central Hall, Hotel, and Grand Bazaar Food Hall.

Churches that have Art Nouveau features are:

- Watts Cemetery Chapel (1896-1898) in Compton, Surrey that is described as a "unique concoction" of Art Nouveau, Celtic, Neo-Romanesque and Egyptian influence with the original style of its architect, Mary Fraser-Tytler.
- St. Mary the Virgin church (1904), in Great Warley, Essex with the interior designed by Sir William Reynolds-Stephens,
- St Matthew's Church (1905-1907) in Paisley, Scotland with the stained glass window by Robert Anning Bell and architecture by William Daniel McLennan, that is described as an Art Nouveau interpretation of Perpendicular Gothic.

== Jugendstil churches of the German Empire and Switzerland ==
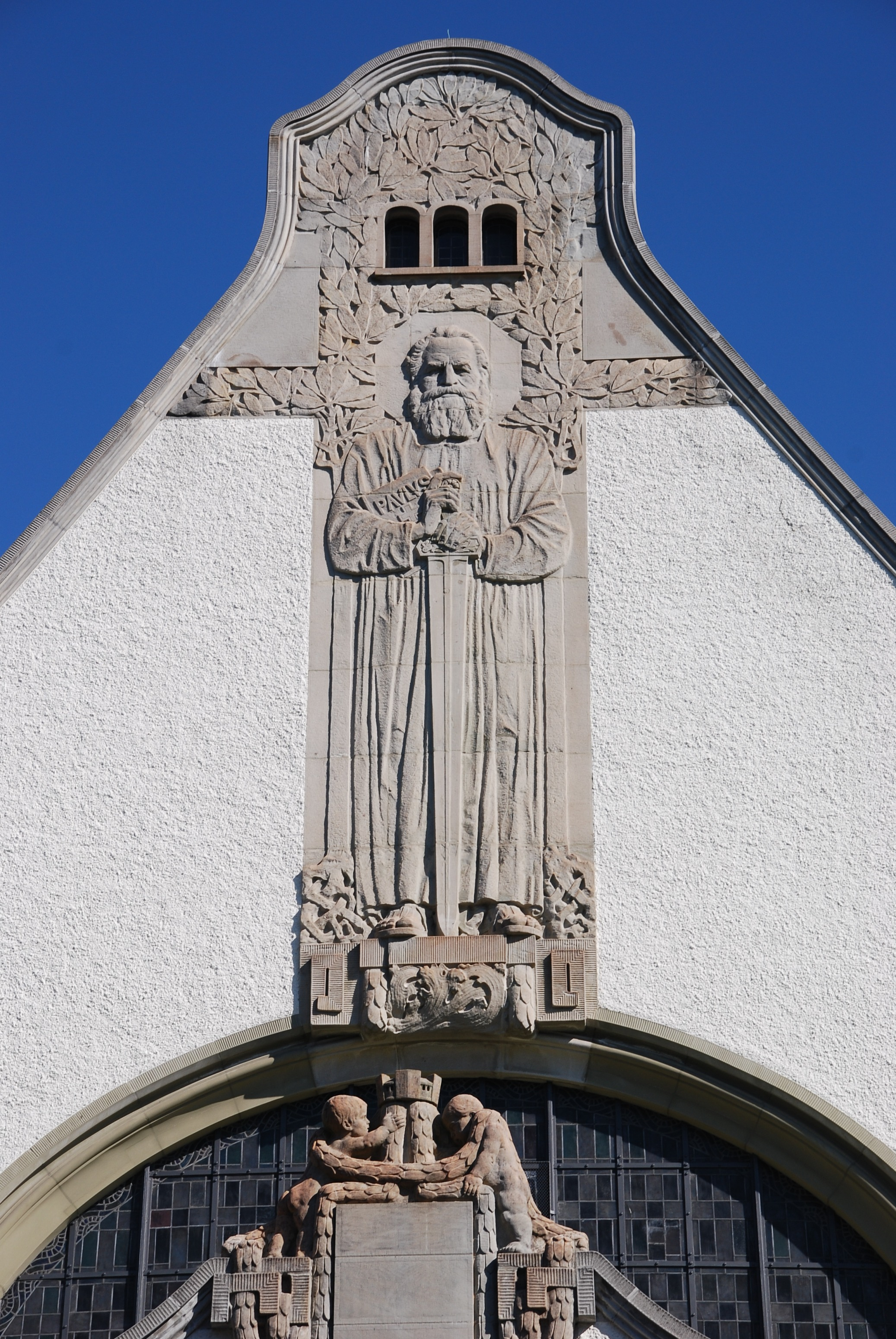
Bas-relief of St. Paul's Church by Karl Moser in Bern

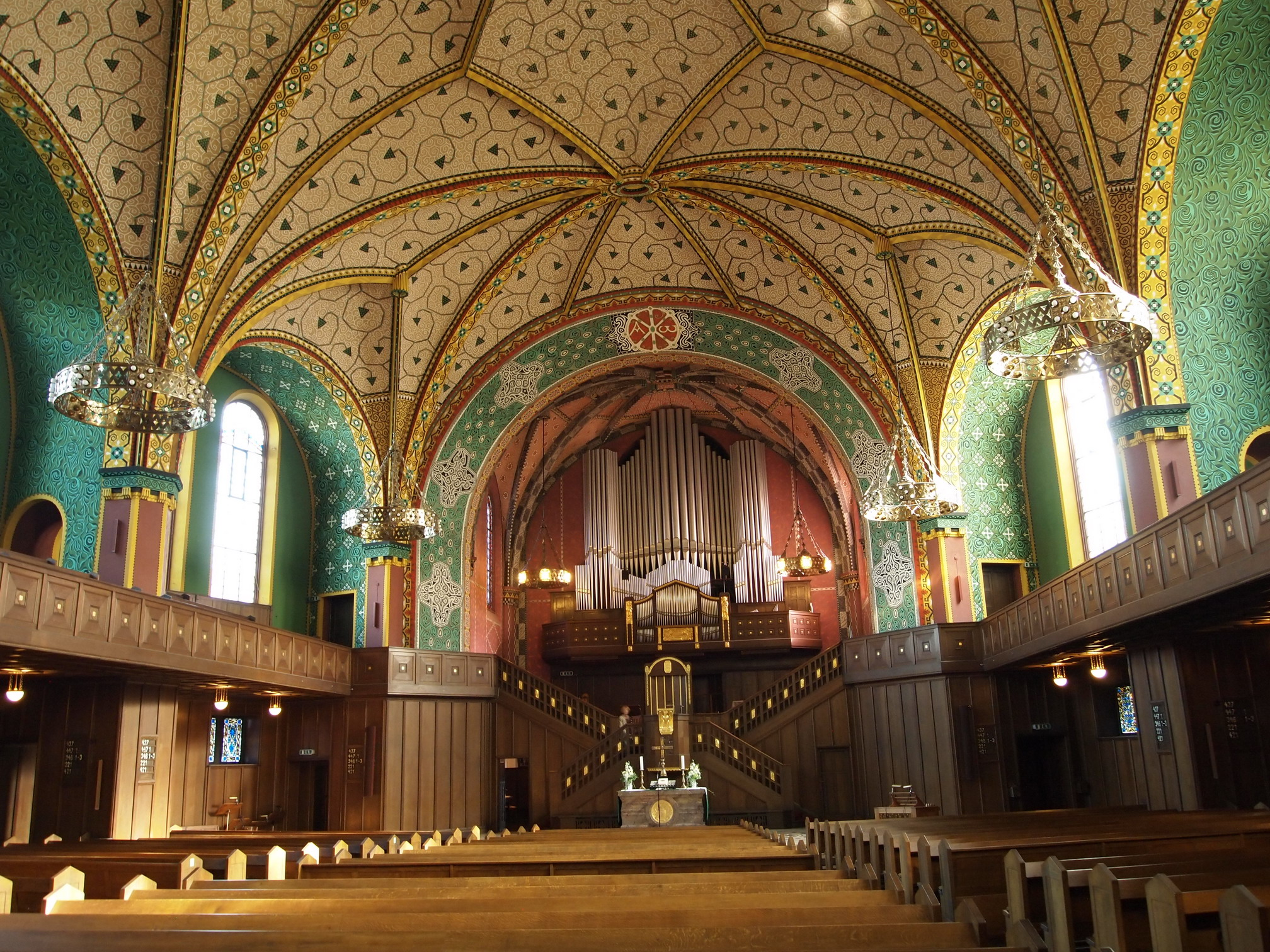
Interior of the Luther church in Wiesbaden in Wiesbaden, Hesse

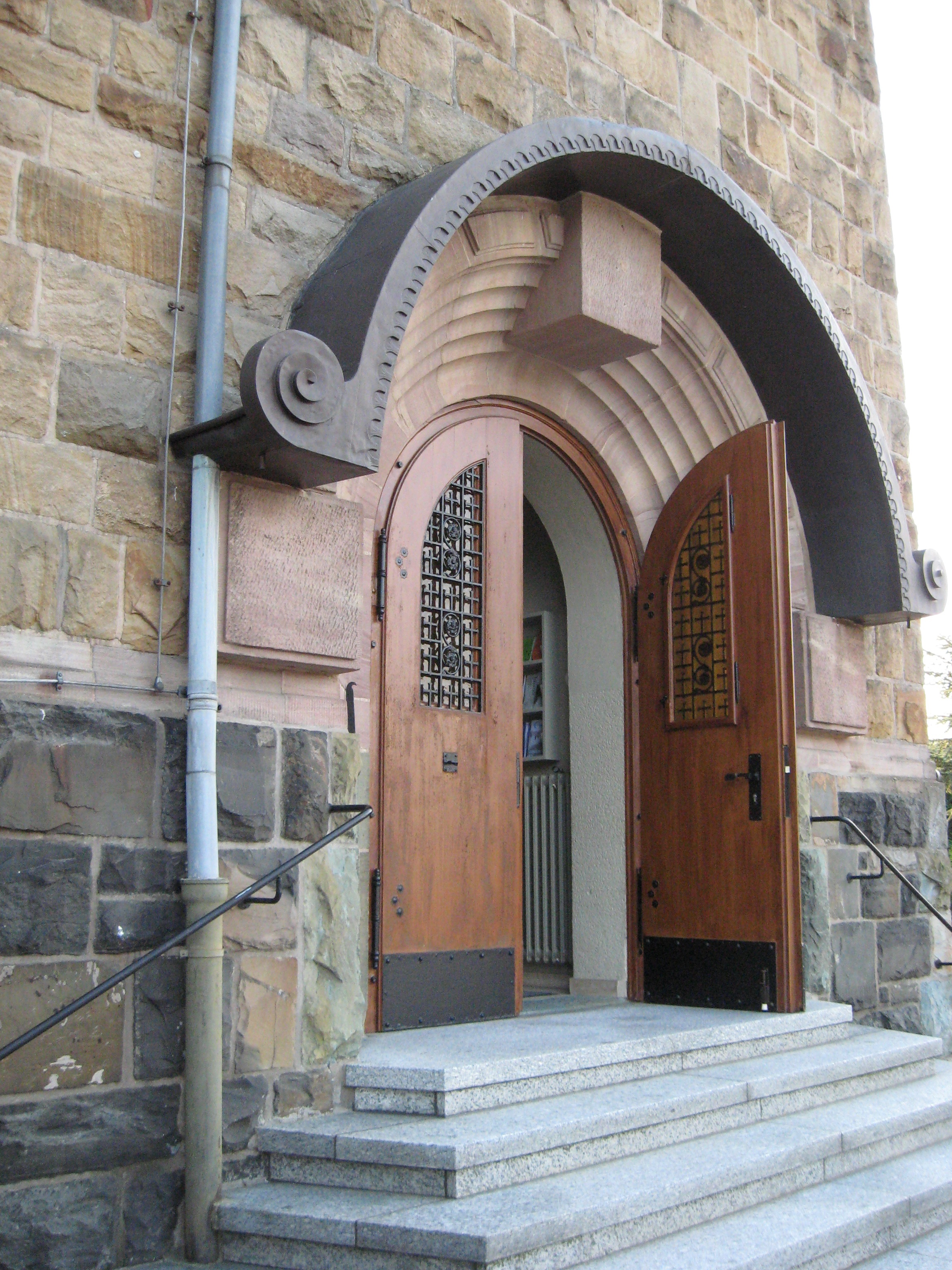
Portal of the Protestant Church in Wilnsdorf, North Rhine-Westphalia

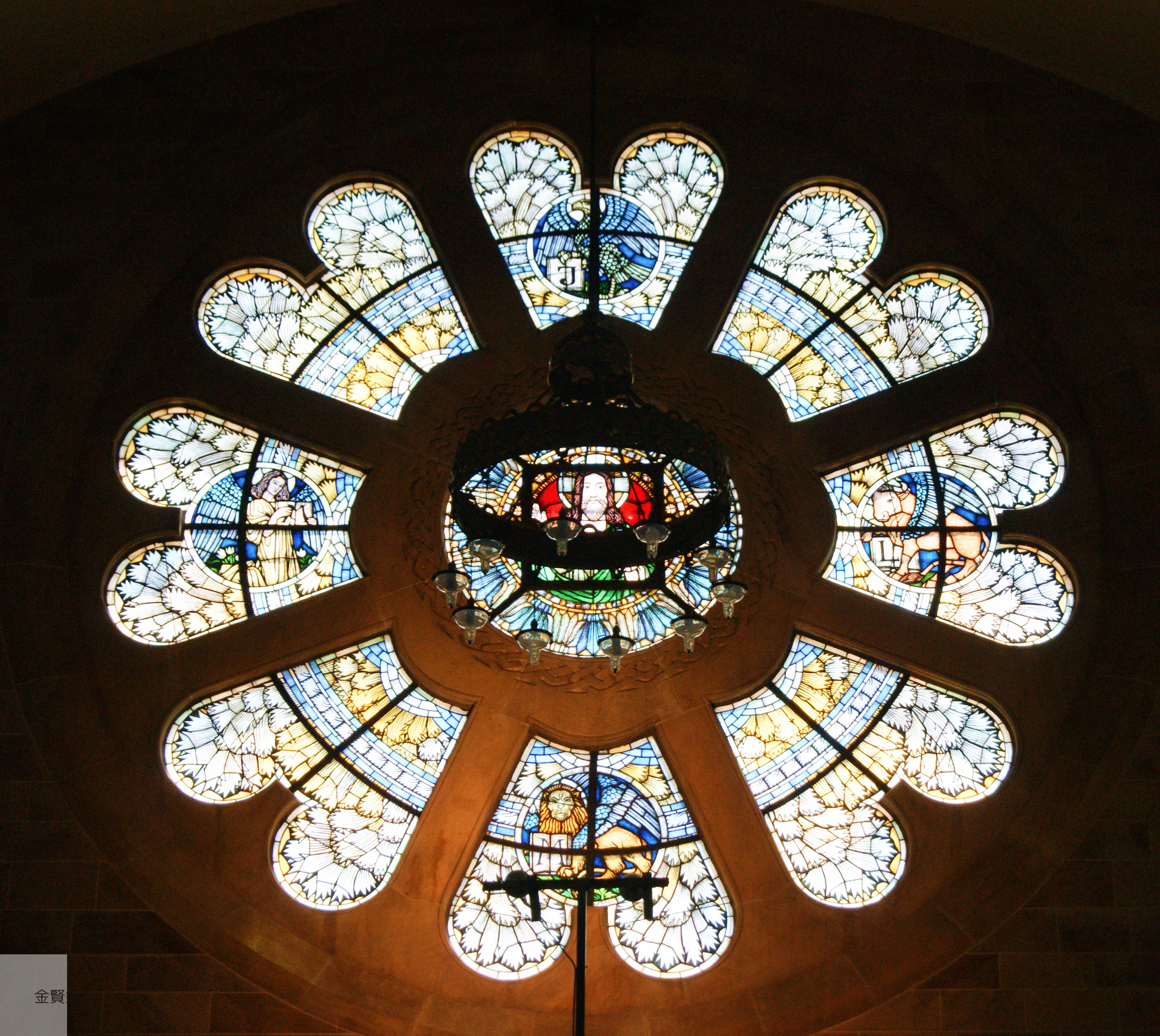
The stained glass windows of St. Paul's Church by Max Laeuger in Basel

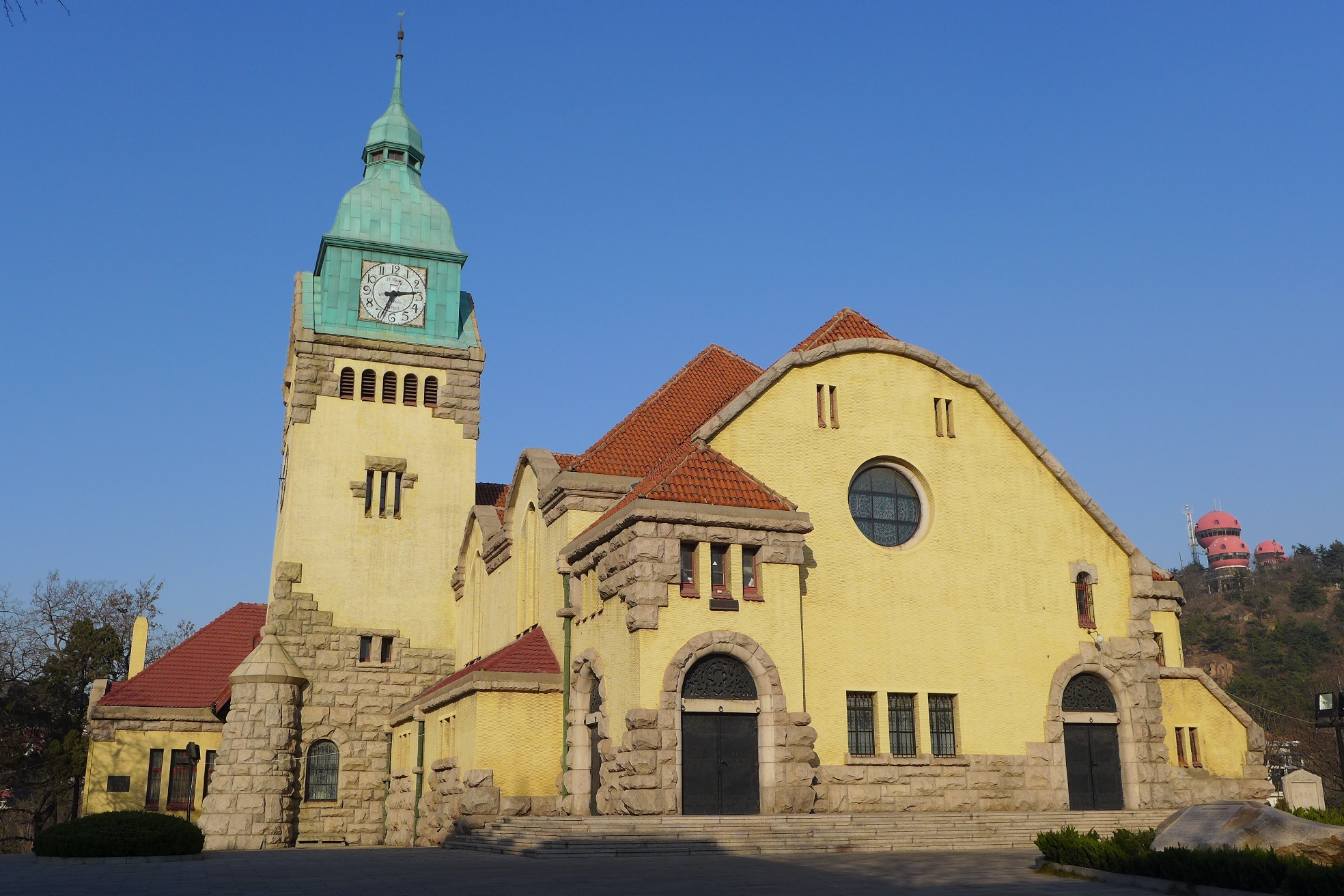
Lutheran church by Curt Rothkegel in Qingdao, China

Churches with both Jugendstil exterior and interior are the Luther church in Wiesbaden, Hesse (1908-1911) by Friedrich Pützer and Protestant Church in Wilnsdorf, North Rhine-Westphalia (1911-1913) by Gustav Mucke. Luther church in Wiesbaden is considered "a harmoniously composed Gesamtkunstwerk of German Protestant culture".

Another notable Jugendstil church is St. Paul's Church (1902-1905) in Bern, built by Swiss architect Karl Moser with stained glass windows by Max Laeuger and considered as one of the best examples of Art Nouveau in the country. Before that artists worked on the construction of the Neo-Romanesque St. Paul's Church (1898-1901) in Basel featuring relief work on the church exterior above the main entrance by sculptor Carl Burckhardt, mosaics on the inner front wall by Heinrich Altherr and stained glass windows by Max Laeuger.

Jugendstil elements of Tabor Church in Rahnsdorf, Berlin Albert Klingner are an altarpiece depicting the Transfiguration of Jesus (1911) and a tableau of the Four Evangelists John, Luke, Mark, and Matthew accompanied by scenes from the Old Testament.

Jugendstil churches were built not only in Europe but also in German colonies in Africa and Asia. Lutheran church in Qingdao, China by Curt Rothkegel is fully Jugendstil while Christ Church in Windhoek by Gottlieb Redecker is a mix of Neo-Romanesque, Jugendstil and Gothic revival.

== Secession temples of Cisleithania (Austria) ==
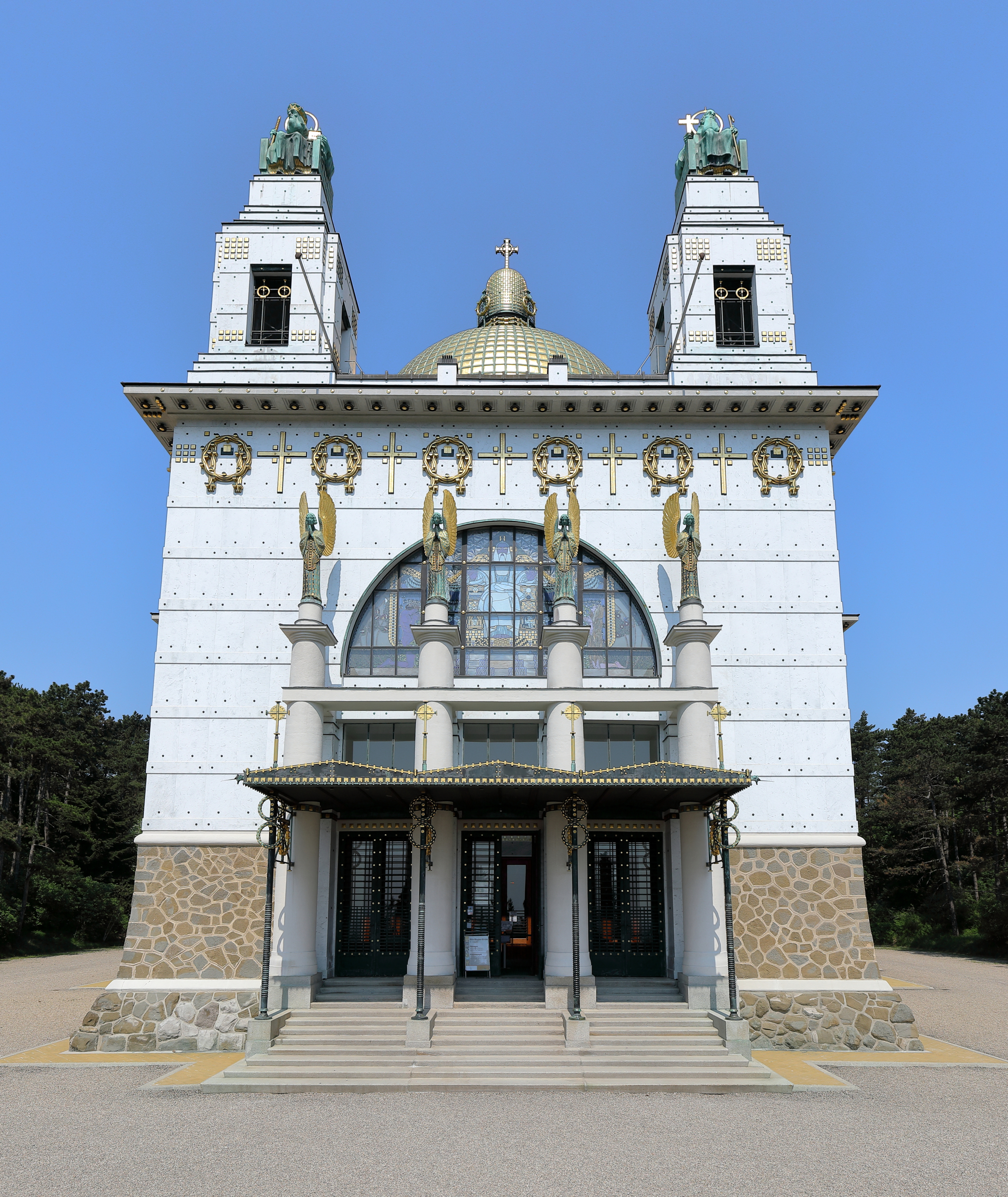
Facade of Kirche am Steinhof with angels by Othmar Schimkowitz in Vienna

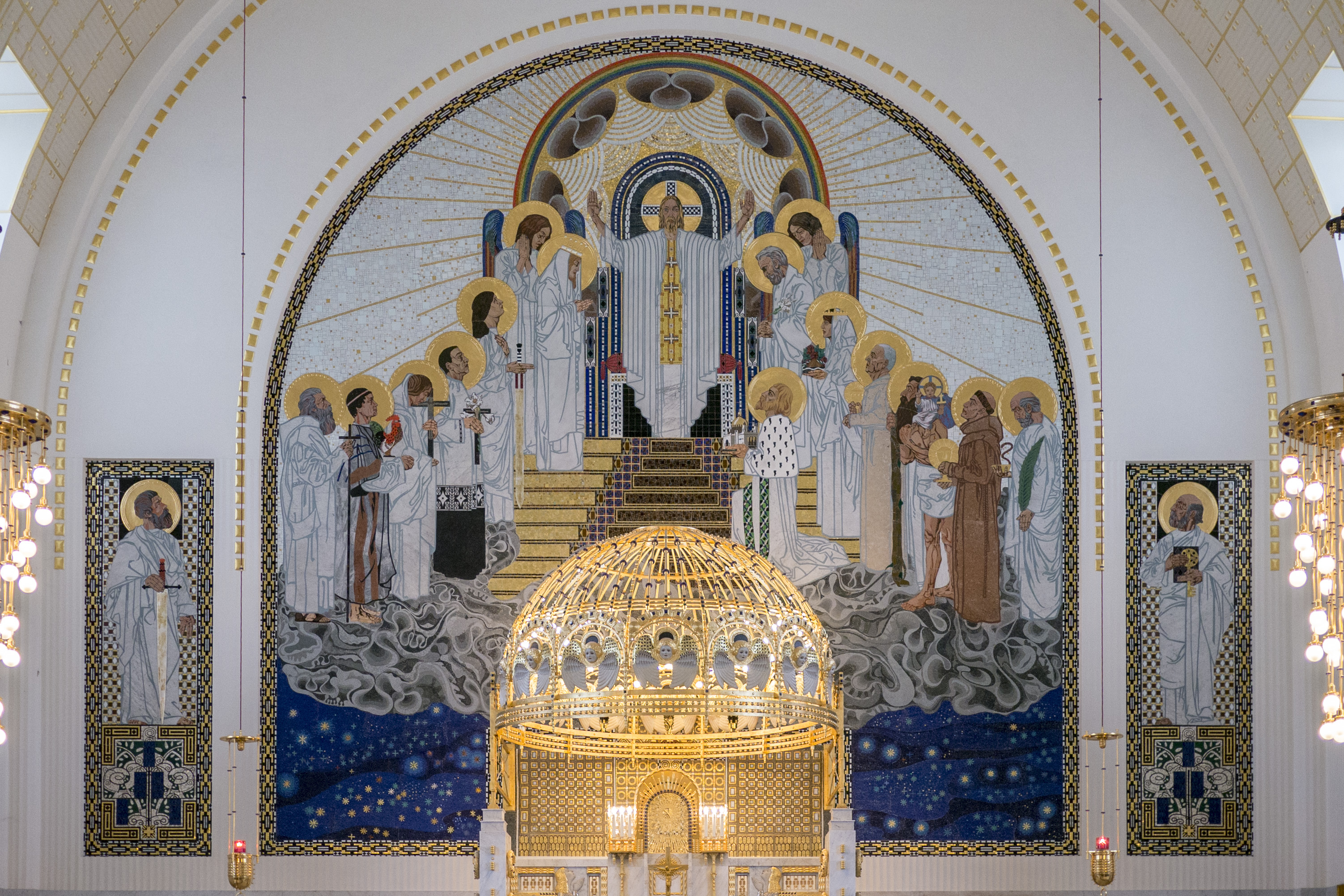
Altar mosaics by Koloman Moser in Kirche am Steinhof, Vienna

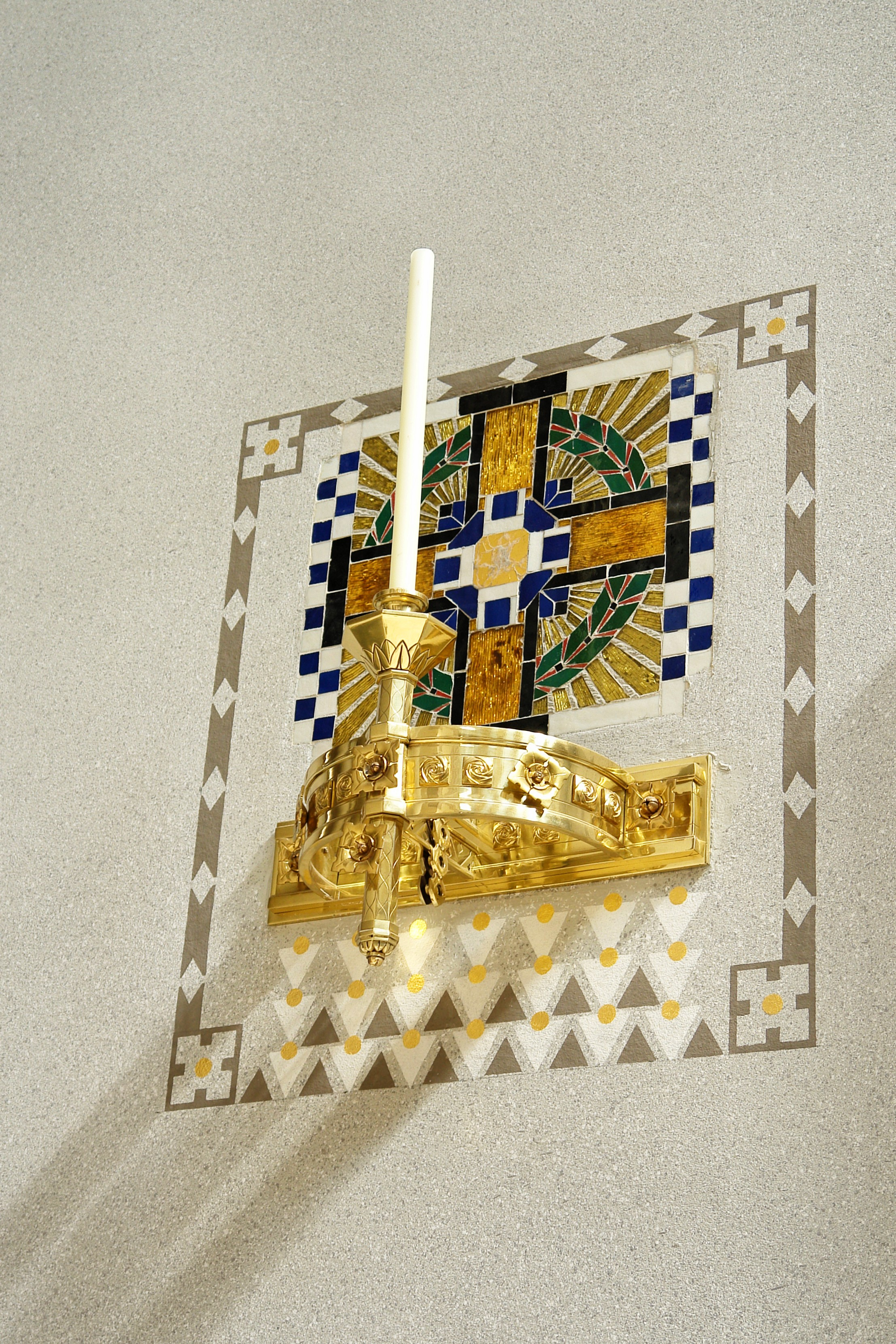
Lamp in St. Charles Borromeo Cemetery Church in Vienna

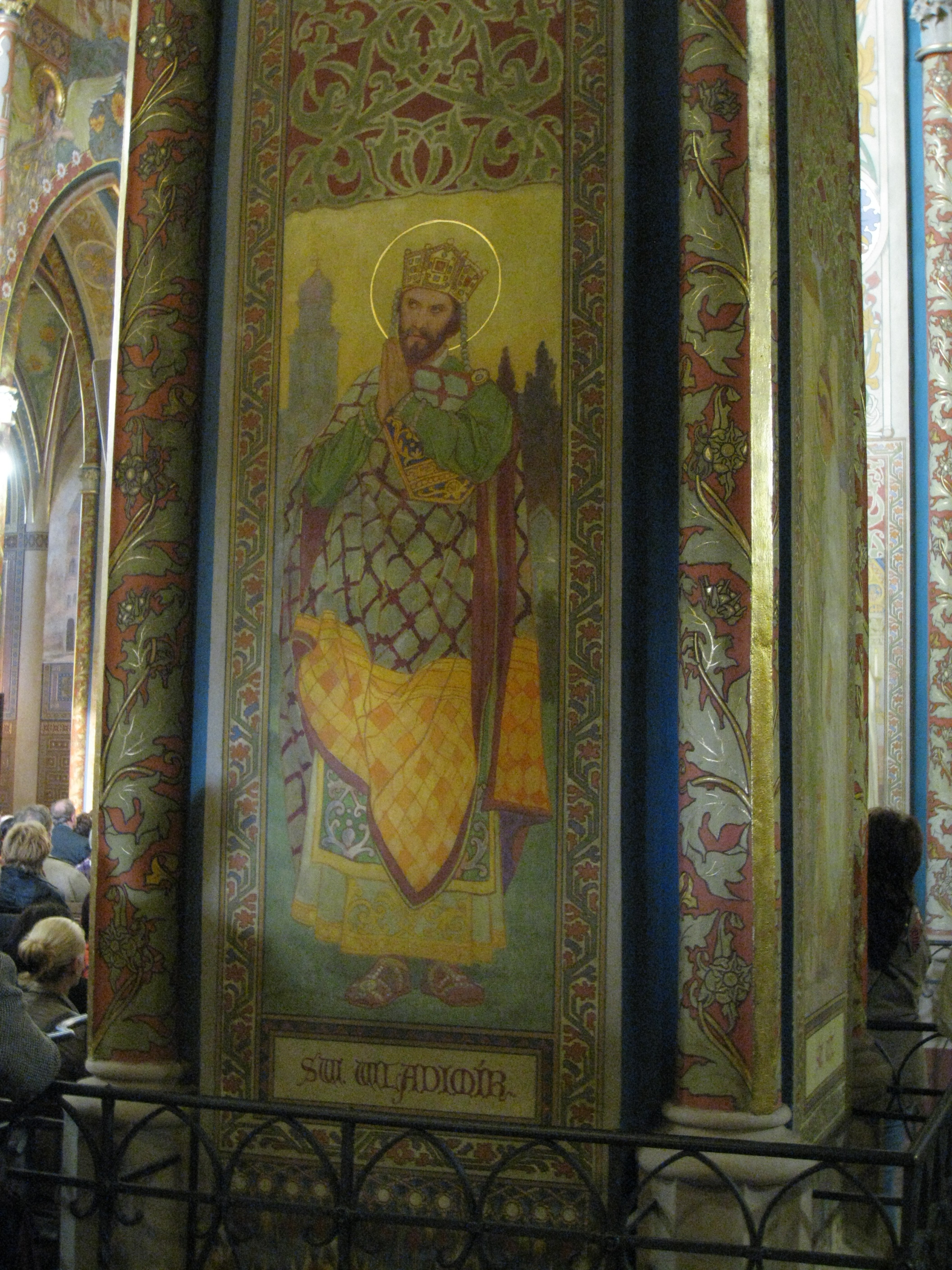
Frescoes of Peter and Paul Basilica in Prague

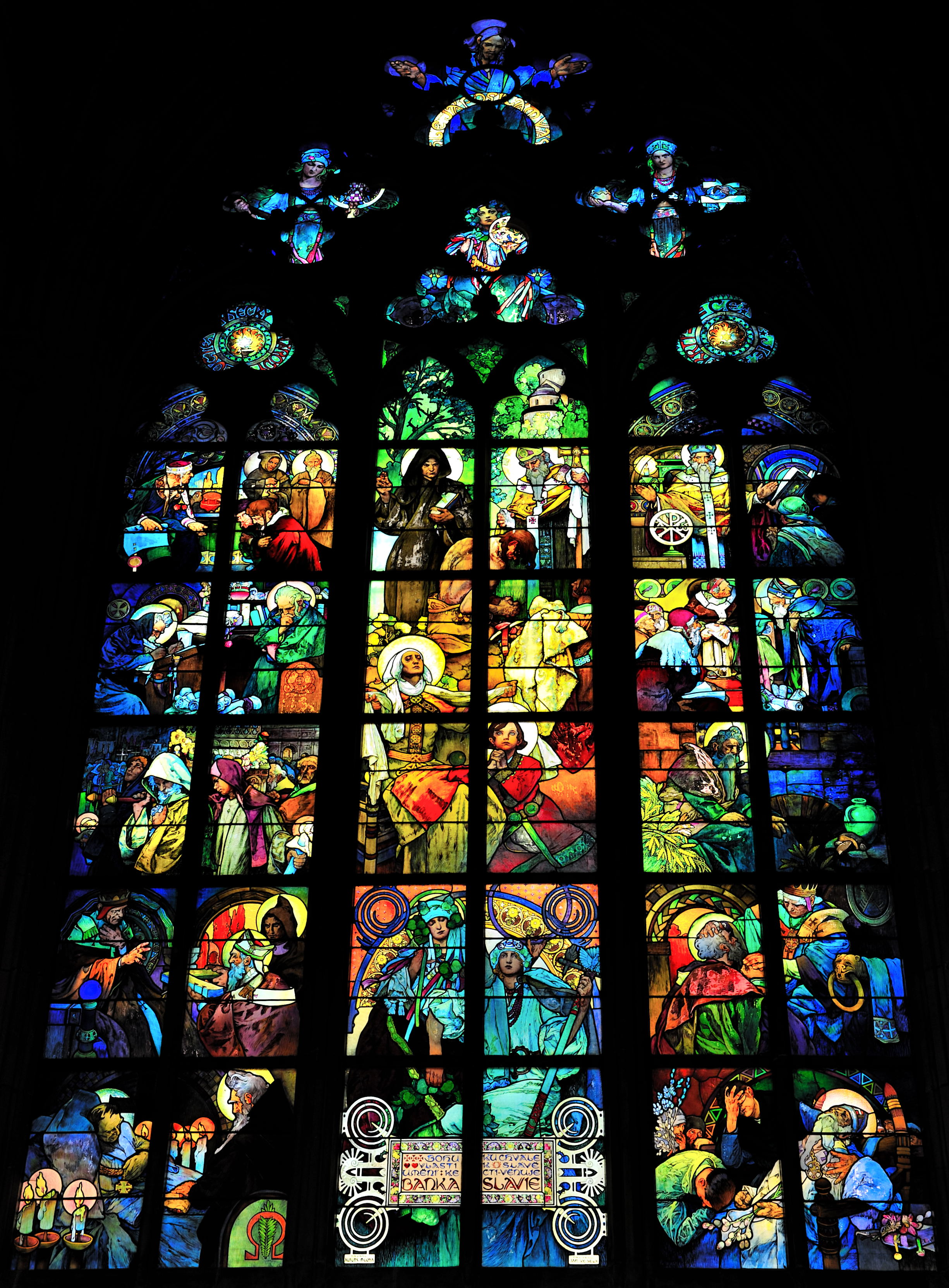
The stained glass window of St. Vitus Cathedral by Alphonse Mucha in Prague

Many well-known Vienna Secession artists were occupied in the construction of Kirche am Steinhof (1903-1907) in Vienna: Otto Wagner was the architect, mosaics and stained glass windows were designed by Koloman Moser and Rudolf Jettmar and made by Leopold Forstner, sculptural angels were made by Othmar Schimkowitz. Leopold Forstner also created stained glass windows for St. Charles Borromeo Cemetery Church (1911-1913), also in Vienna, built to designs by the architect Max Hegele.

Notable Art Nouveau frescoes can be found in Peter and Paul Basilica in Prague, made by František Urban and his wife Marie Urbanová-Zahradnická.

Famous Czech painter Alphonse Mucha created stained glass windows for St. Vitus Cathedral in Prague. Though created in the 1930s, when Art Nouveau has already faded, his style remained unchanged.

Some Art Nouveau features can be found in the interior of Jubilee Synagogue in Prague.

== Szecesszió temples of the Kingdom of Hungary ==
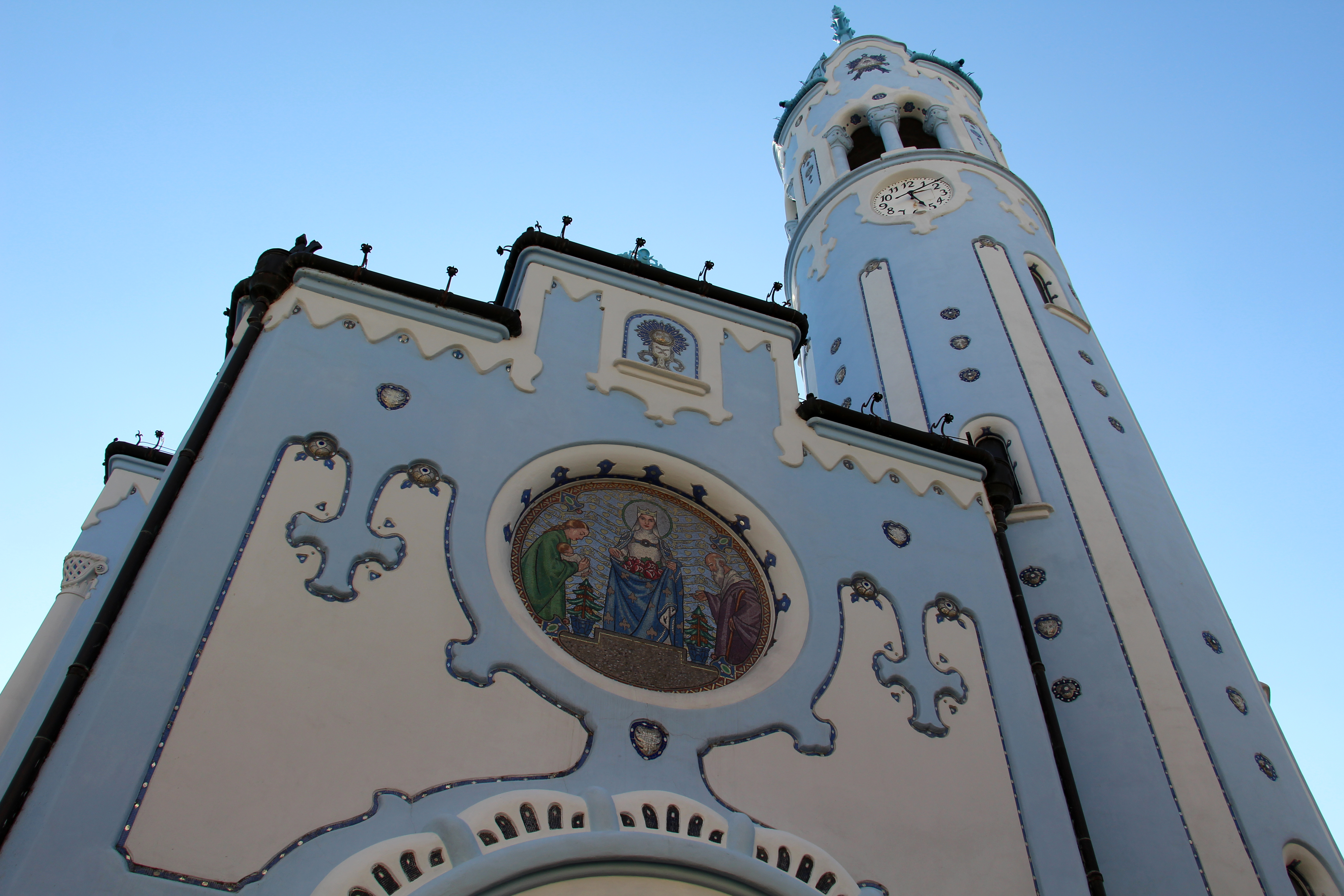
Facade of Blue Church by Ödön Lechner in Bratislava, Slovakia

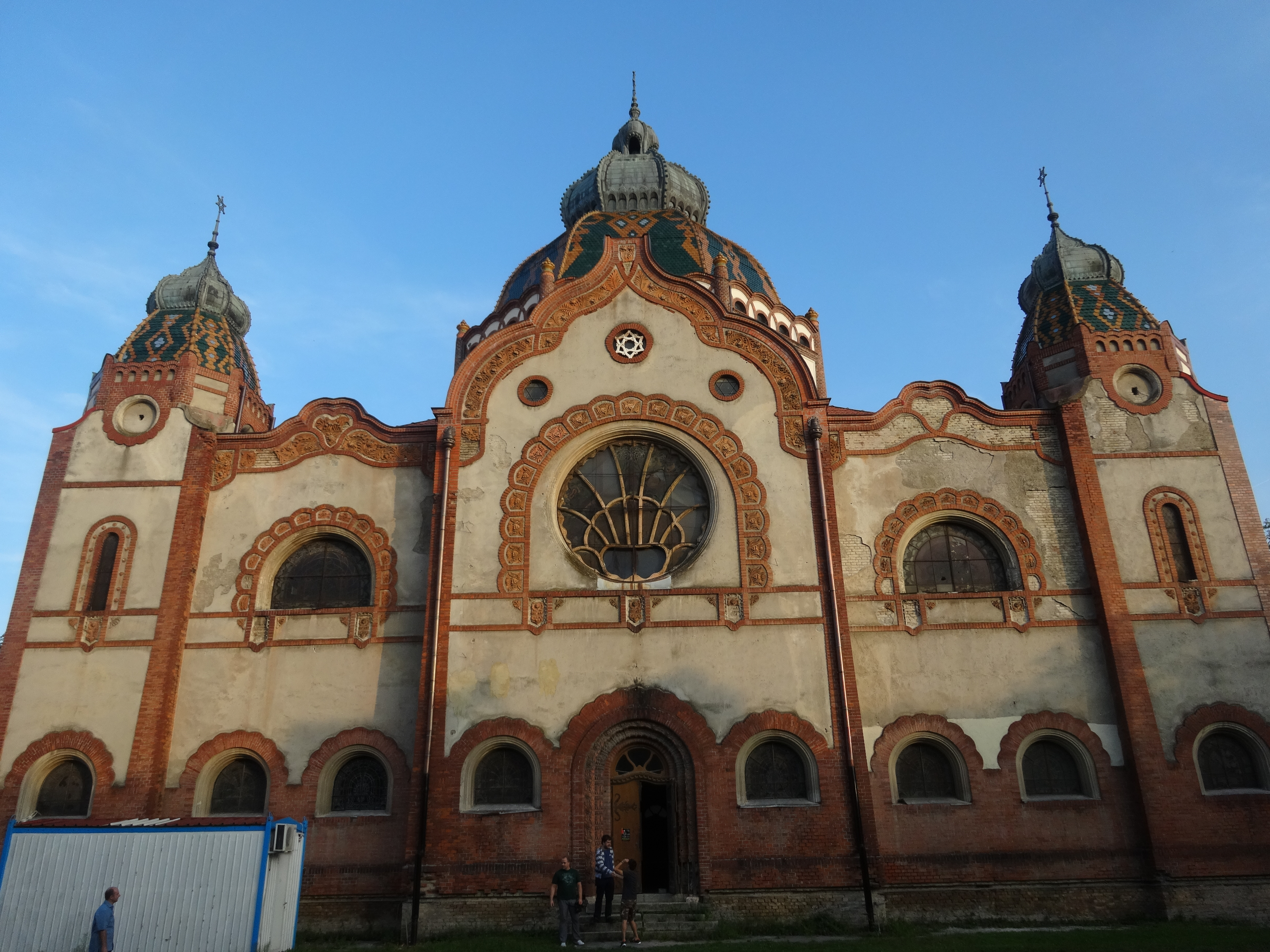
Synagogue before restoration in Subotica, Serbia

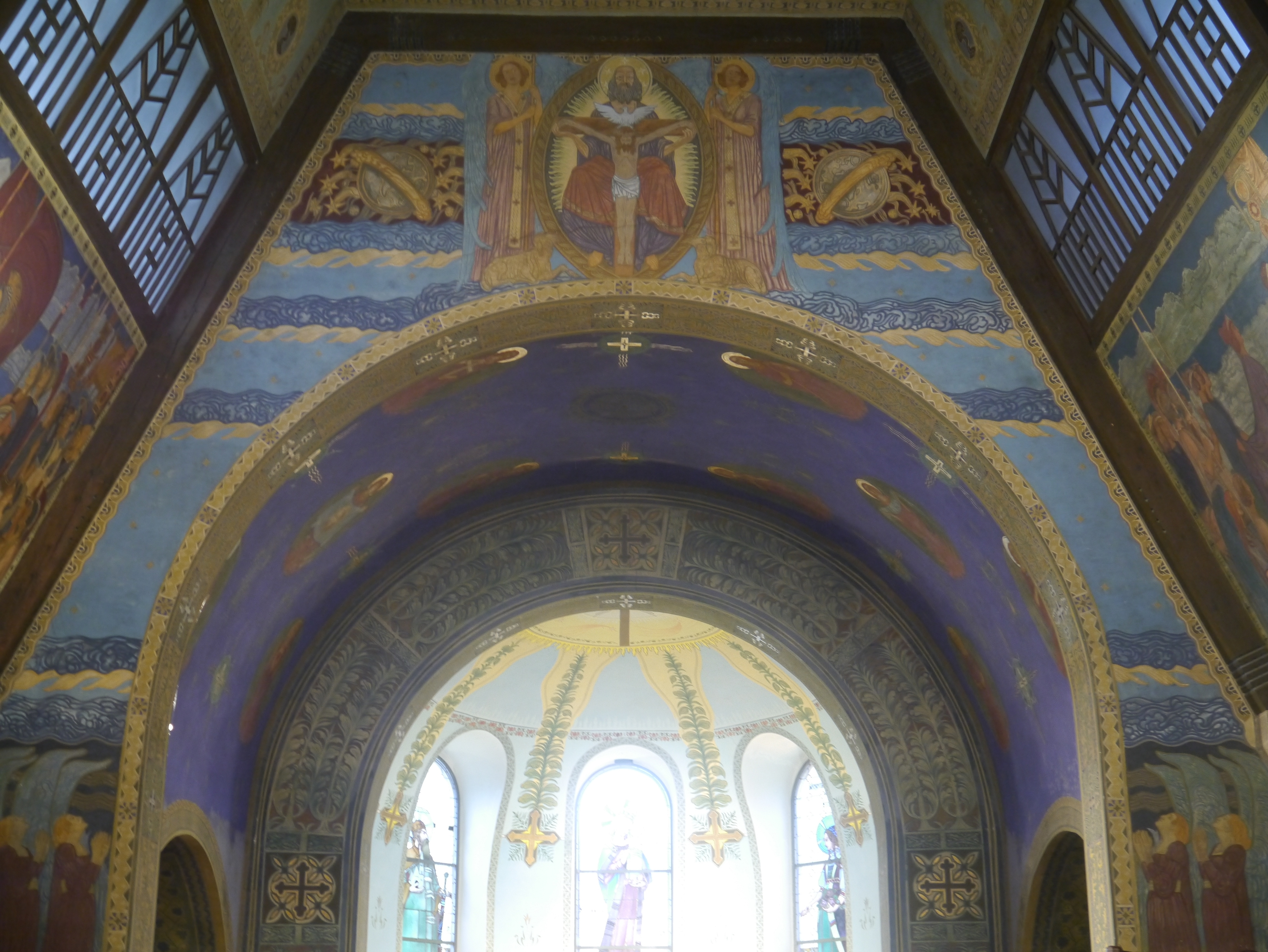
Interior of the Roman Catholic church by Aladár Körösfői-Kriesch in Zebegény, Hungary

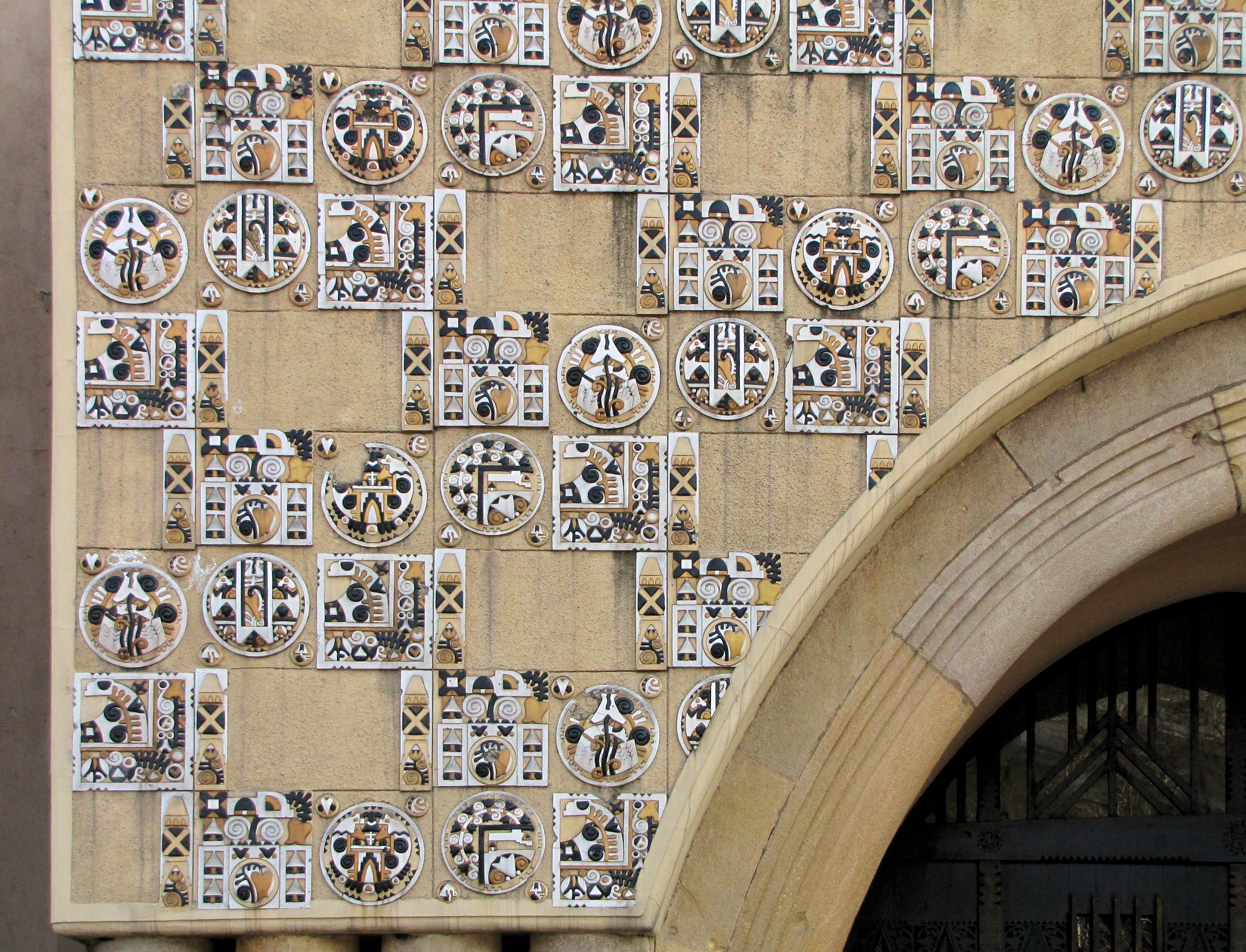
Facade of Fasori Reformed Church by Aladár Árkay in Budapest

The pioneer and prophet of the Szecesszió (Secession in Hungarian), the architect Ödön Lechner created several churches as well. His Saint Ladislaus church in Kőbánya (1894-1899) is regarded as eclectic with Szecesszió features, while Blue Church (1909-1913) in Pozsony (present-day Bratislava) is truly Szecesszió.

Lechner's disciples Marcell Komor and Dezső Jakab were commissioned to build the Synagogue in Szabadka (now Subotica, Serbia) in 1901–1903. Included into the List of 100 Most Endangered Sites in the World, it has undergone a full restoration completed in 2018.

Another notable Hungarian architect was Károly Kós. His Roman Catholic churches in Zebegény, Hungary (1908–09) and Cluj-Napoca, Romania (1913–1914) are regarded at National Romantic. Similar to his style the Fasori Reformed Church (1911-1913) by Aladár Árkay was built in Budapest. The church in Zebegény was painted by Aladár Körösfői-Kriesch, the founder of Gödöllő Art Colony.

== National Romantic churches in Grand Duchy of Finland ==
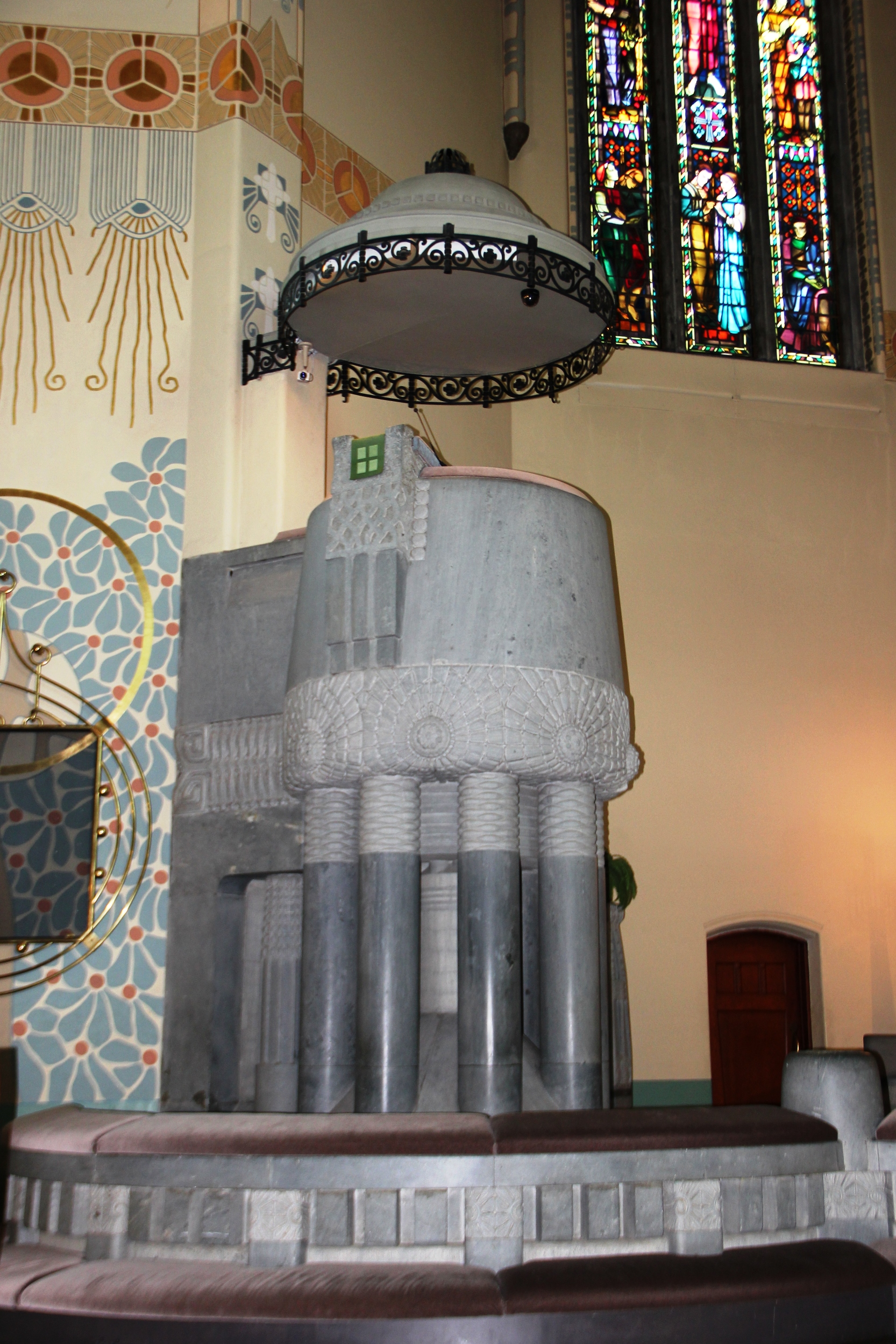
The pulpit of St Michael's Church by Lars Sonck in Turku

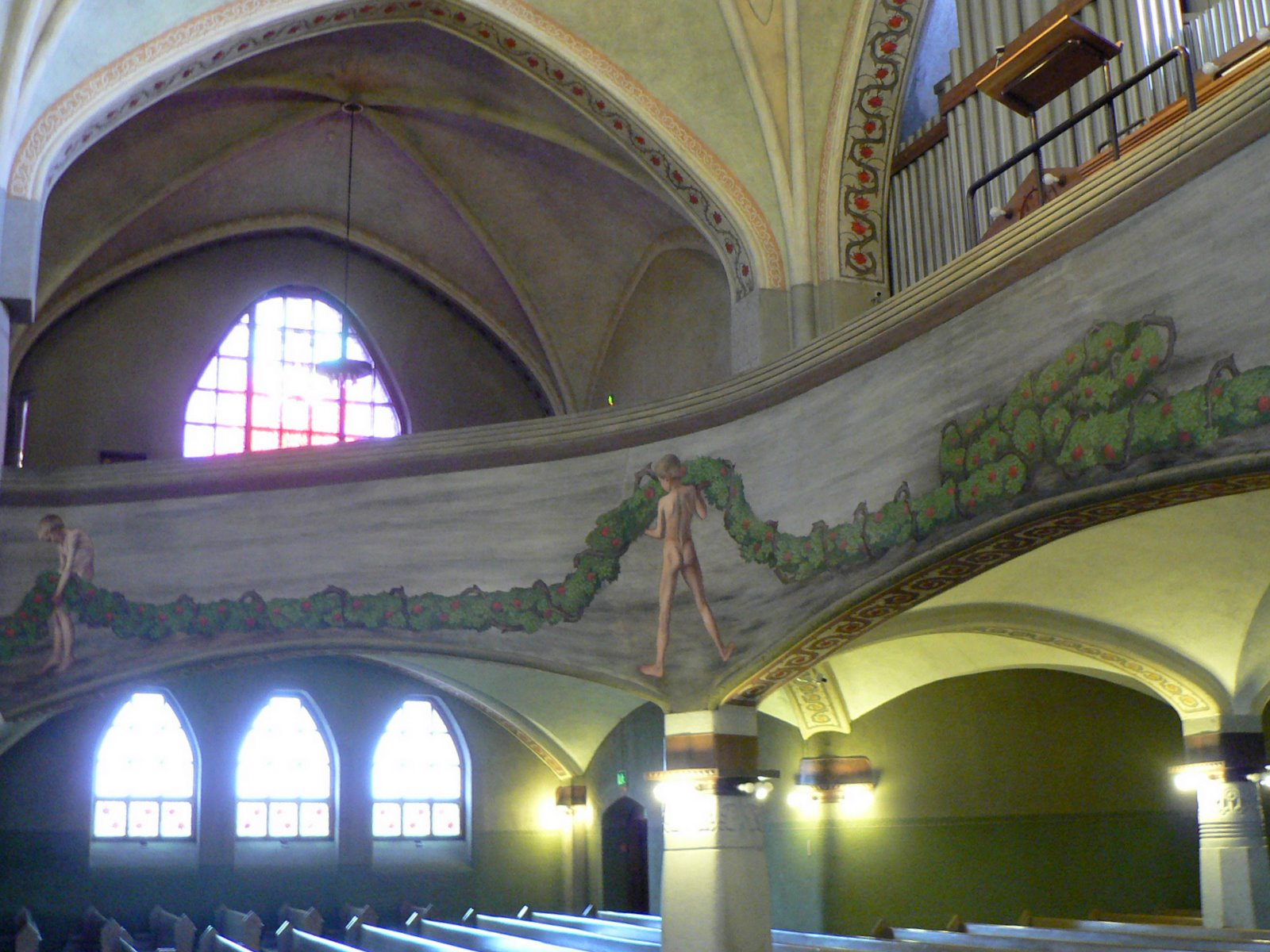
Interior of the cathedral with frescoes by Hugo Simberg in Tampere

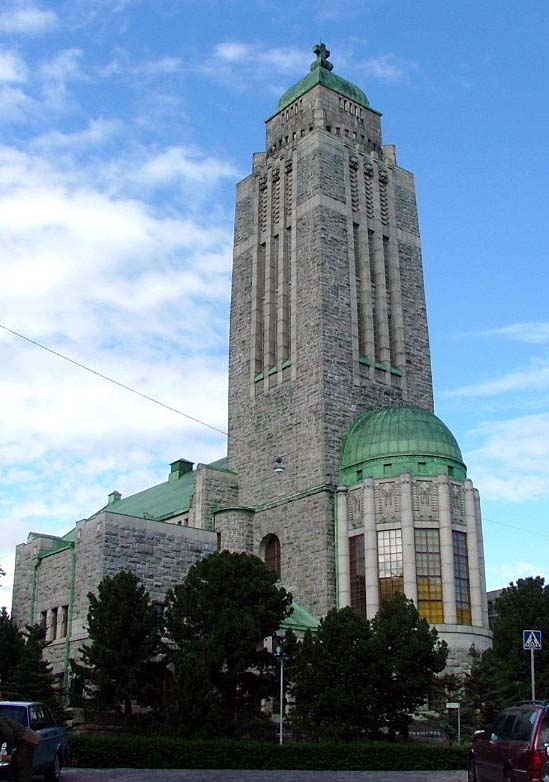
Kallio Church by Lars Sonck in Helsinki

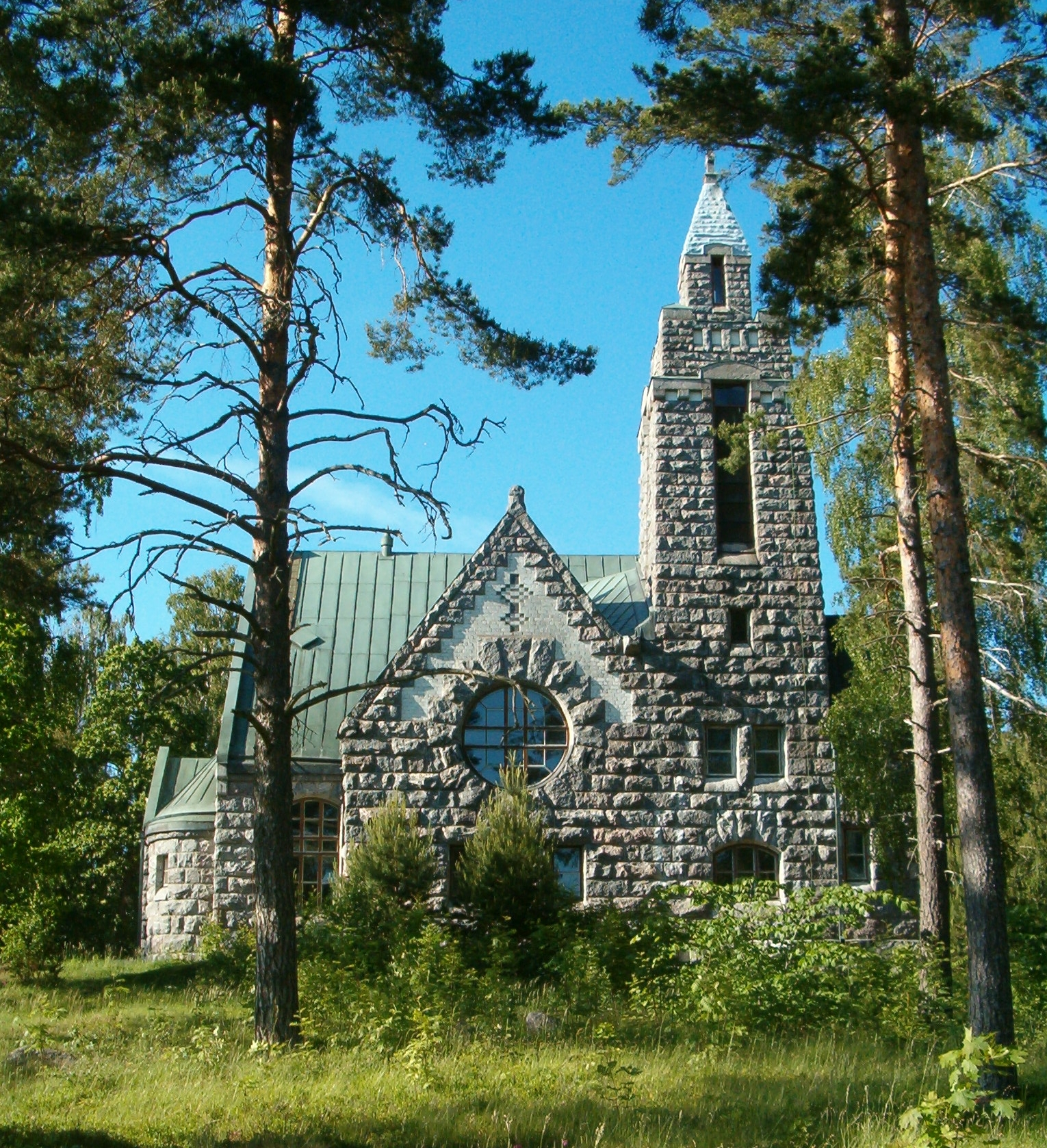
The church by Josef Stenbäck in Karuna

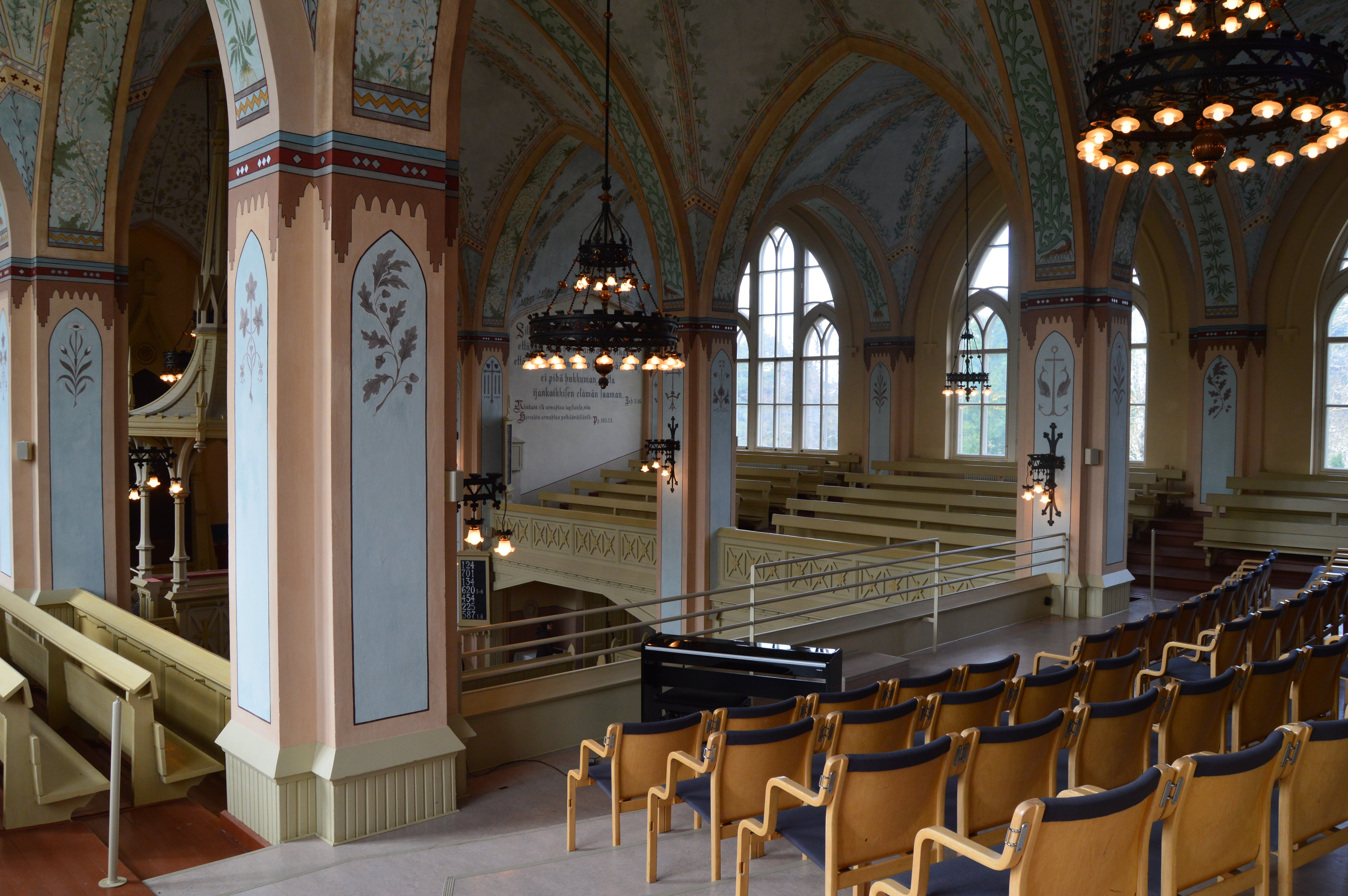
Interior of Joensuu Church by Josef Stenbäck in Joensuu

Several dozens of National Romantic churches were built in Grand Duchy of Finland. Some of the largest are the Cathedral in Tampere (1902-1907) and the Kallio Church (1908-1912) in Helsinki, both designed by Lars Sonck. The cathedral is famous for its frescoes, painted by the symbolist Hugo Simberg, featuring versions of The Wounded Angel and The Garden of Death. The altar-piece, representing the future resurrection of people of all races, was painted by Magnus Enckell. Sonck's St Michael's Church in Turku (1894-1905) has Gothic Revival exterior but features National Romantic interior.

Josef Stenbäck was the architect of more than a dozen National Romantic churches throughout the Grand Duchy, e.g. Karuna Church (1908–1910). Three of the churches are now at the territory of Russia. (Note: Namely in Primorsk, Leningrad Oblast, Zelenogorsk, Saint Petersburg and Melnikovo, Leningrad Oblast)

A notable example of wooden Art Nouveau church is Oulujoki Church (1907–1908) in Oulu by Victor J. Sucksdorff

== National Romantic churches in Sweden, Norway, and Denmark ==
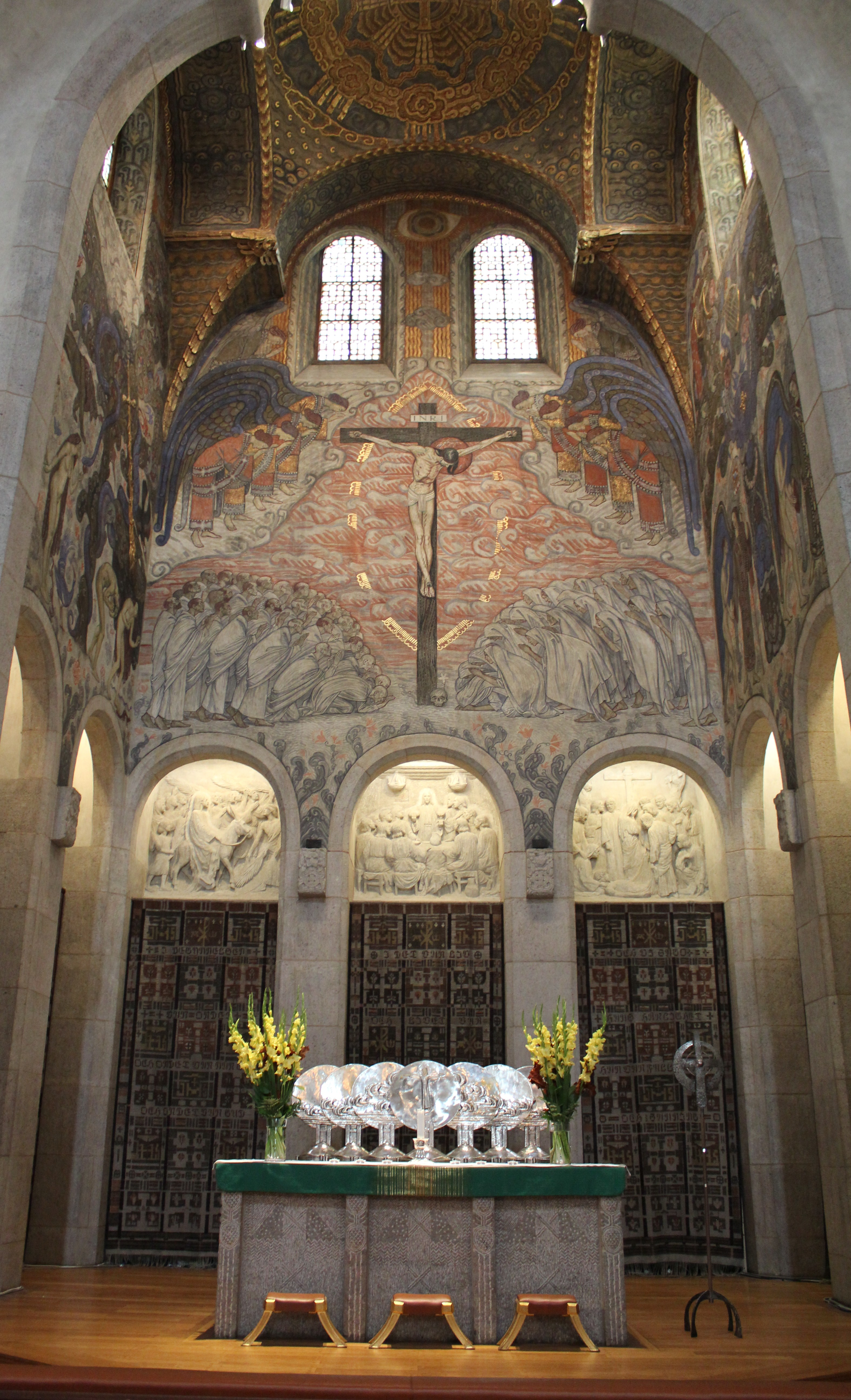
Altar of Engelbrekt Church in Stockholm, Sweden

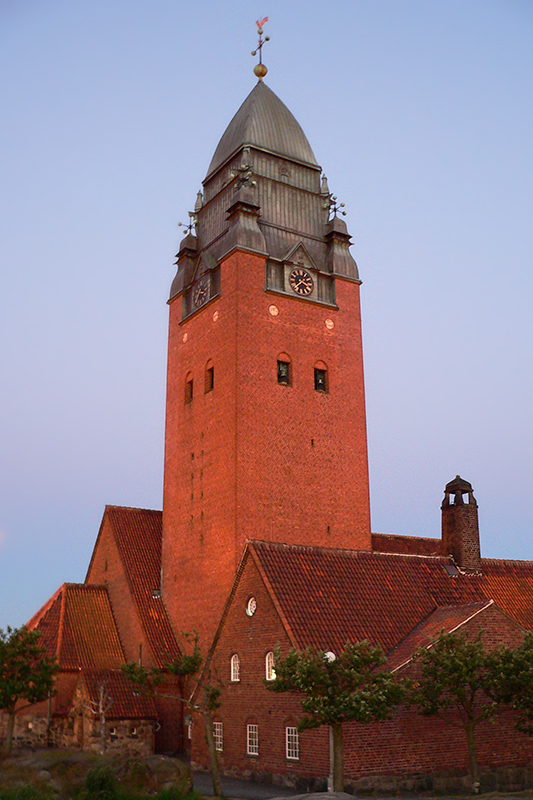
Masthugg Church in Gothenburg, Sweden

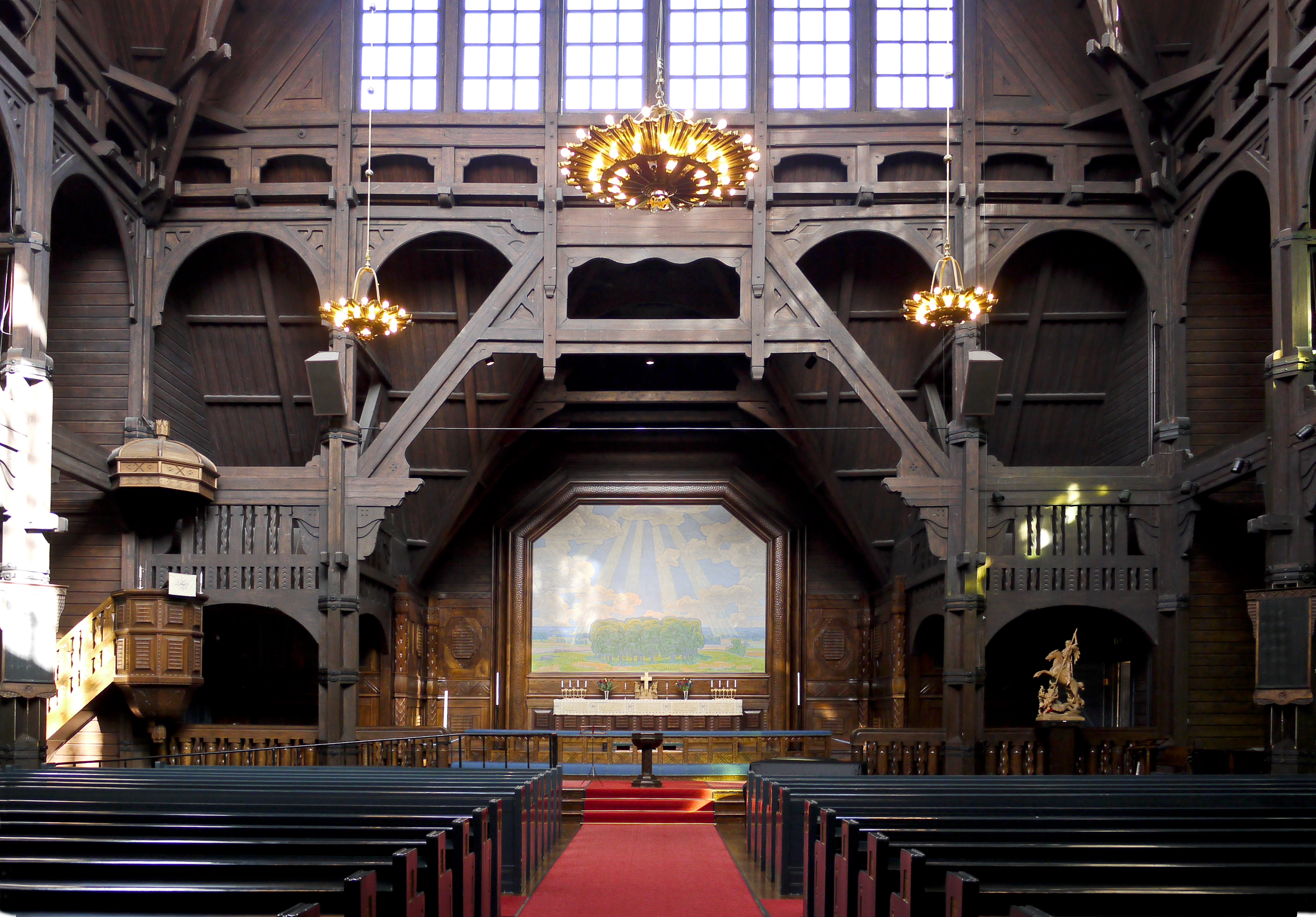
Altar of the church in Kiruna by Prince Eugen, Duke of Närke, Sweden

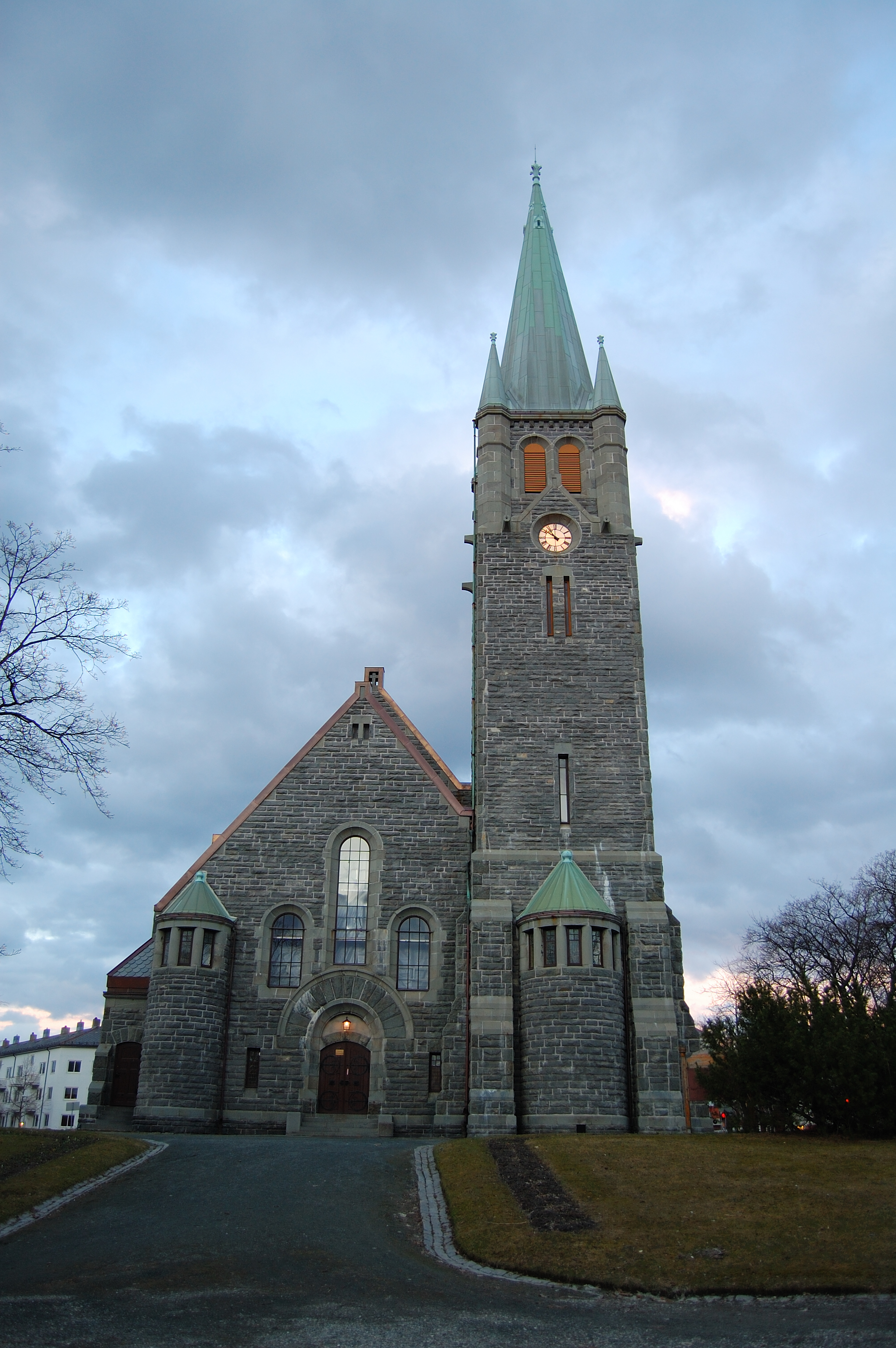
Lademoen Church in Trondheim, Norway

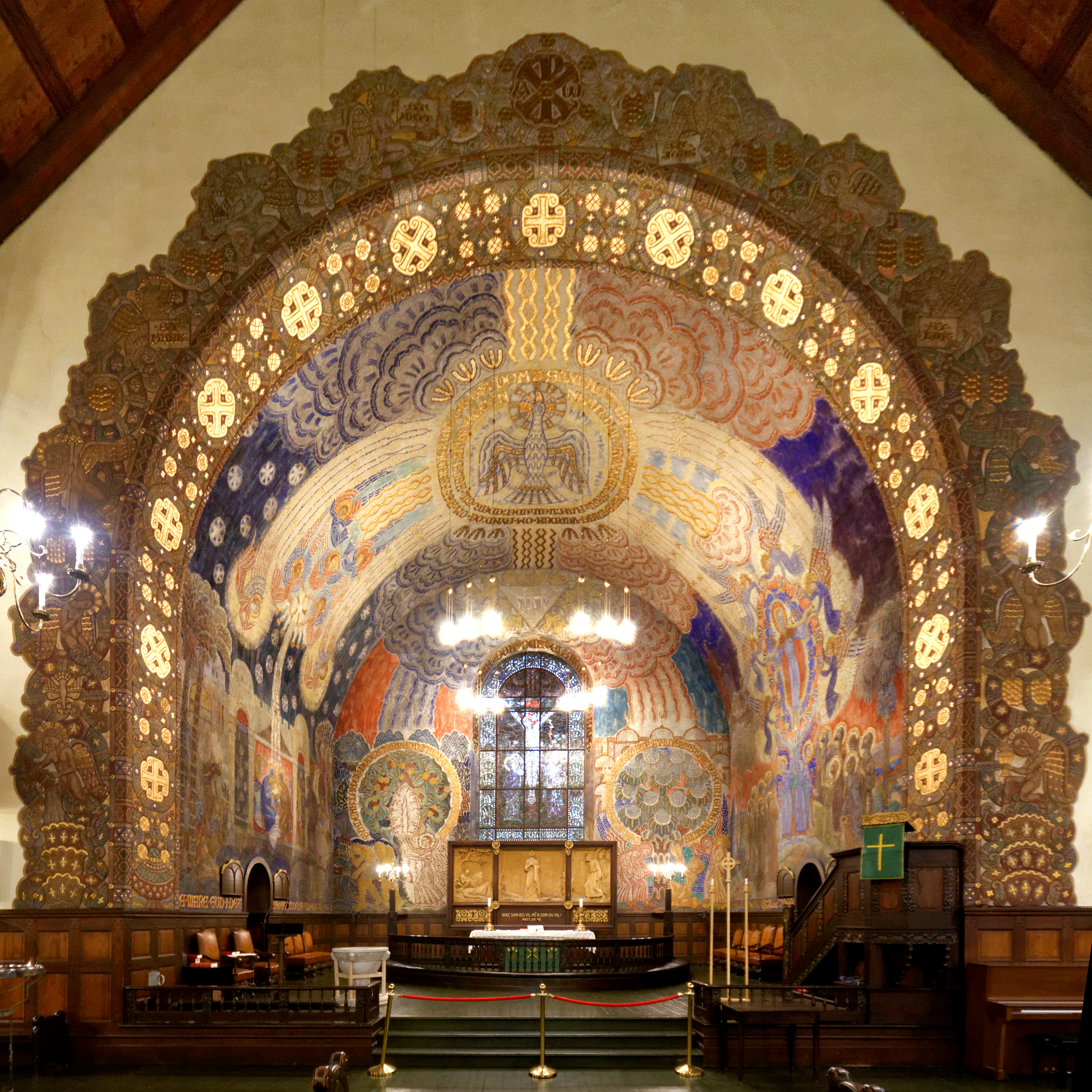
The altar of the Ålesund Church, Norway

Churches with National Romantic altars in Sweden are Engelbrekt Church in Stockholm (1910-1914) and wooden Kiruna Church (1909-1912, the altar by Prince Eugen, Duke of Närke). St. John's Church (1903-1906) in Malmö and Masthugg Church (1907-1914) in Gothenburg are also notable. In Denmark, Swedish Gustaf's Church (1908-1911) in Copenhagen can be noted.

In Norway, the example of a stone and brick National Romantic church is Lademoen Church (1903–05) in Trondheim. In Ålesund, a church completed in 1909 was built in Art Nouveau style along with many other buildings in the city. Neo-Gothic church in Skien (1894) features Art Nouveau stained glass windows. Other examples of churches built in a mix of Neo-Gothic and National Romantic styles are Fagerborg Church and Vålerenga Church (both - in Oslo).

== Temples of Modern Style in the Russian Empire ==
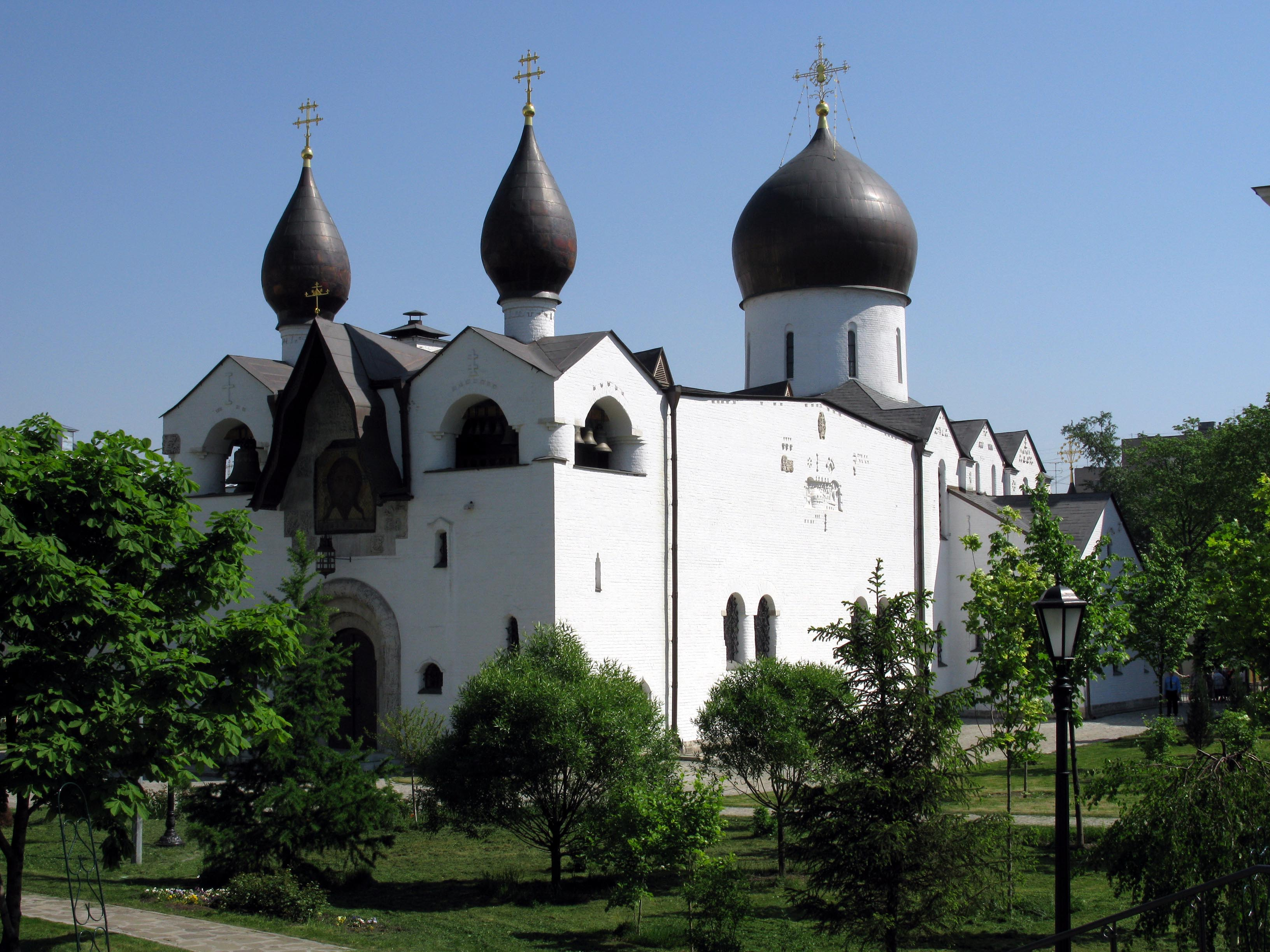
The katholikon of Marfo-Mariinsky Convent by Alexey Shchusev in Moscow

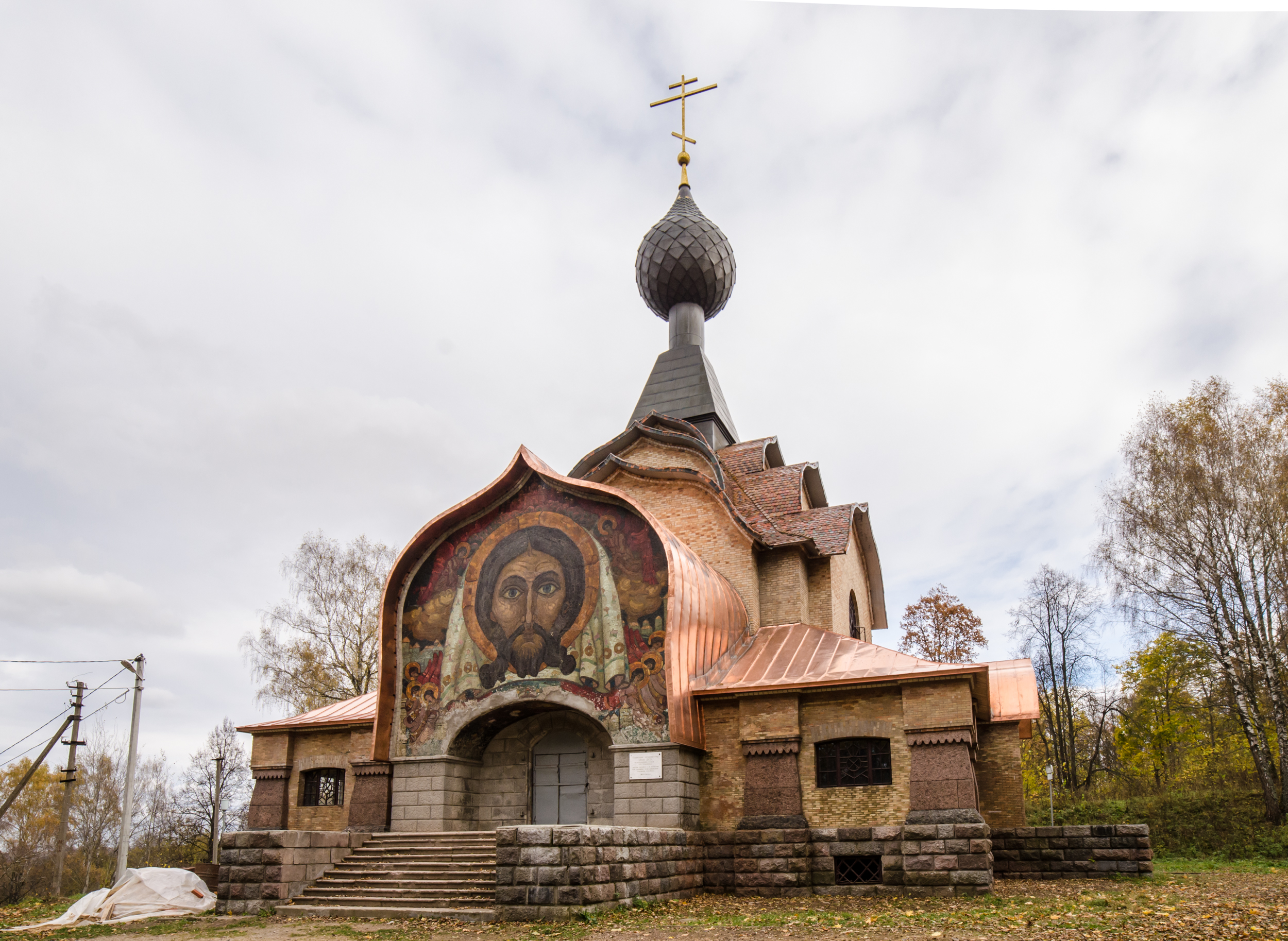
Church of the Holy Spirit in Talashkino

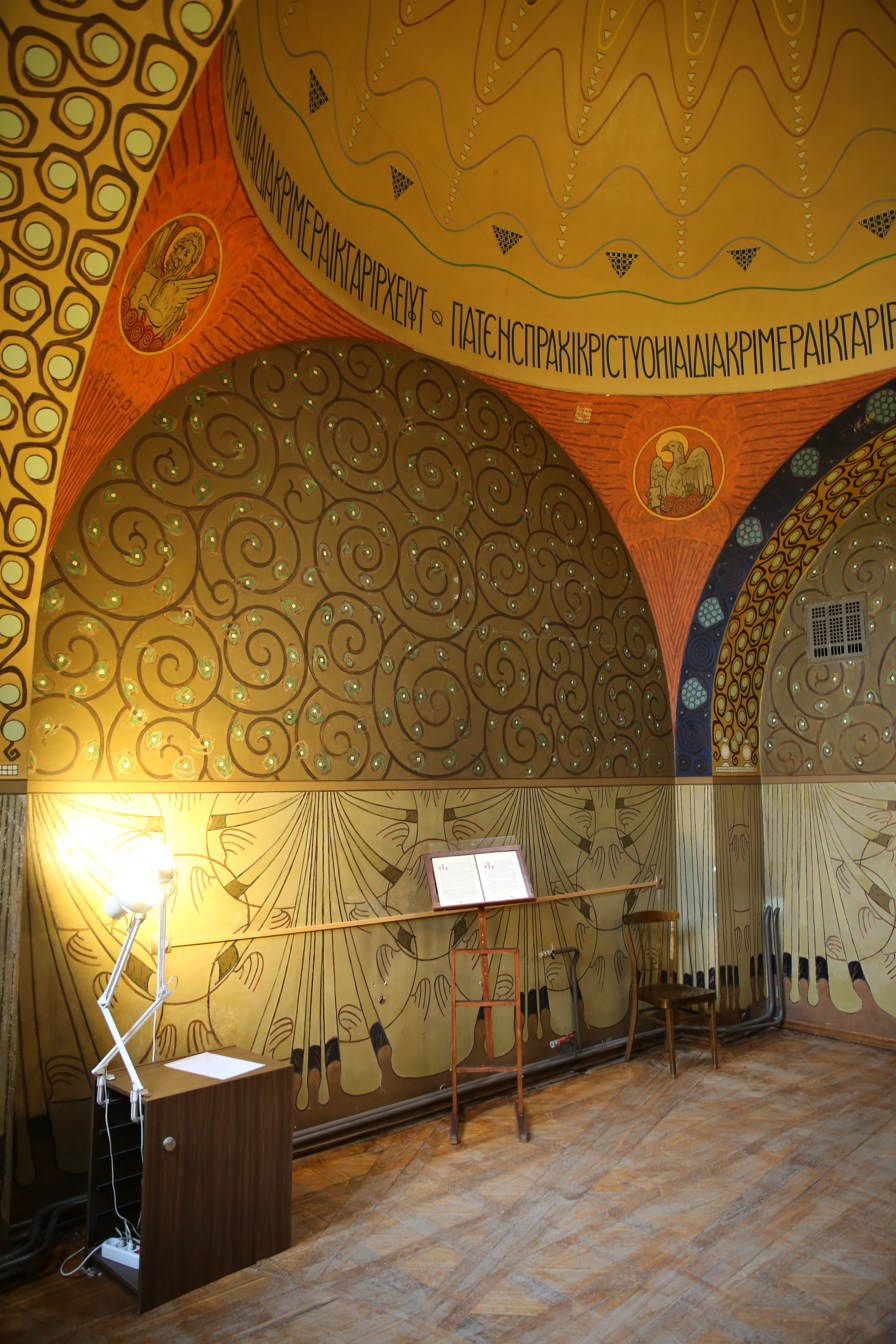
Old Believers chapel in Ryabushinsky House by Franz (Fyodor) Schechtel in Moscow

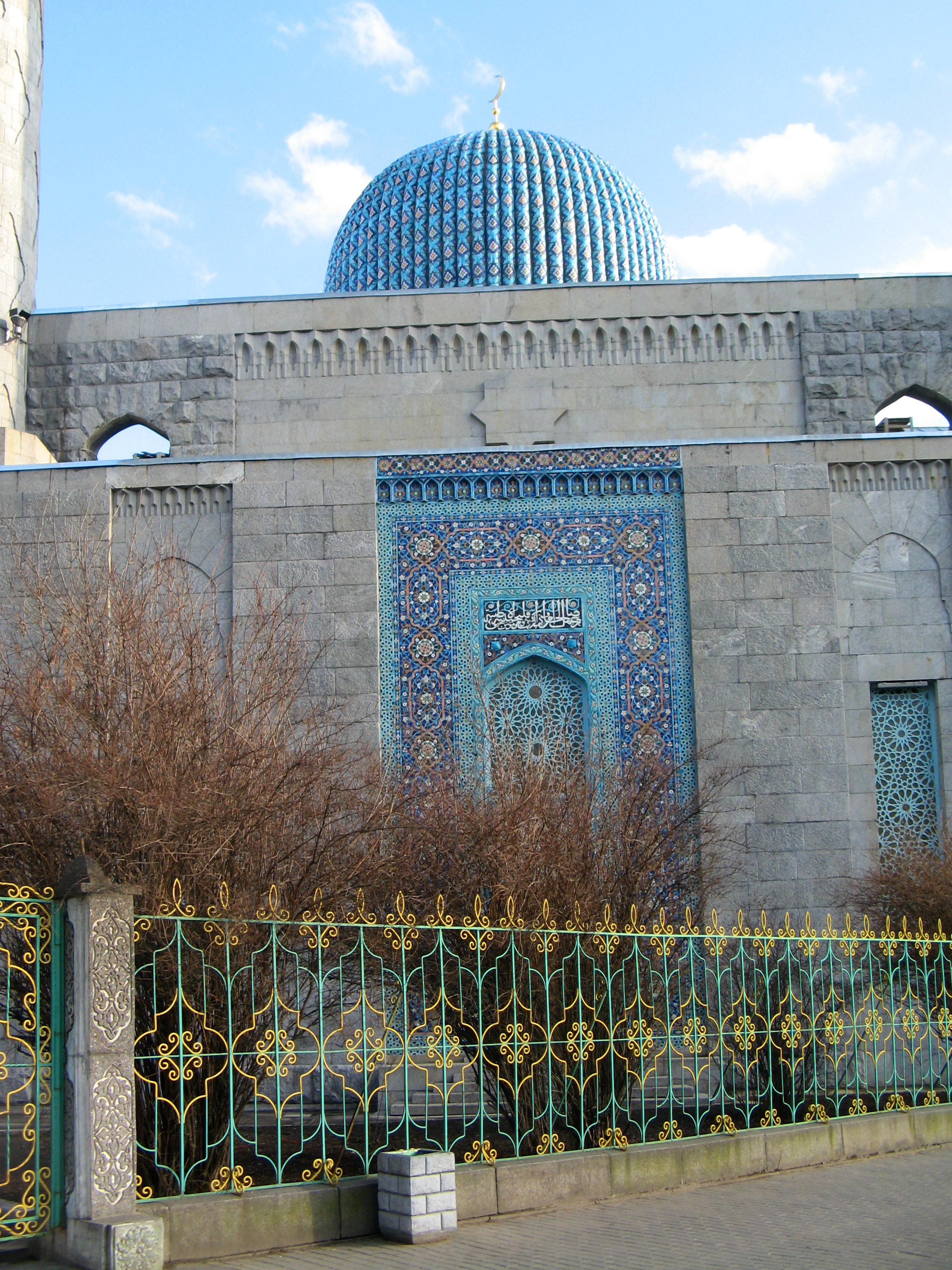
Granite facade of the mosque by Nikolai Vasilyev in Saint Petersburg

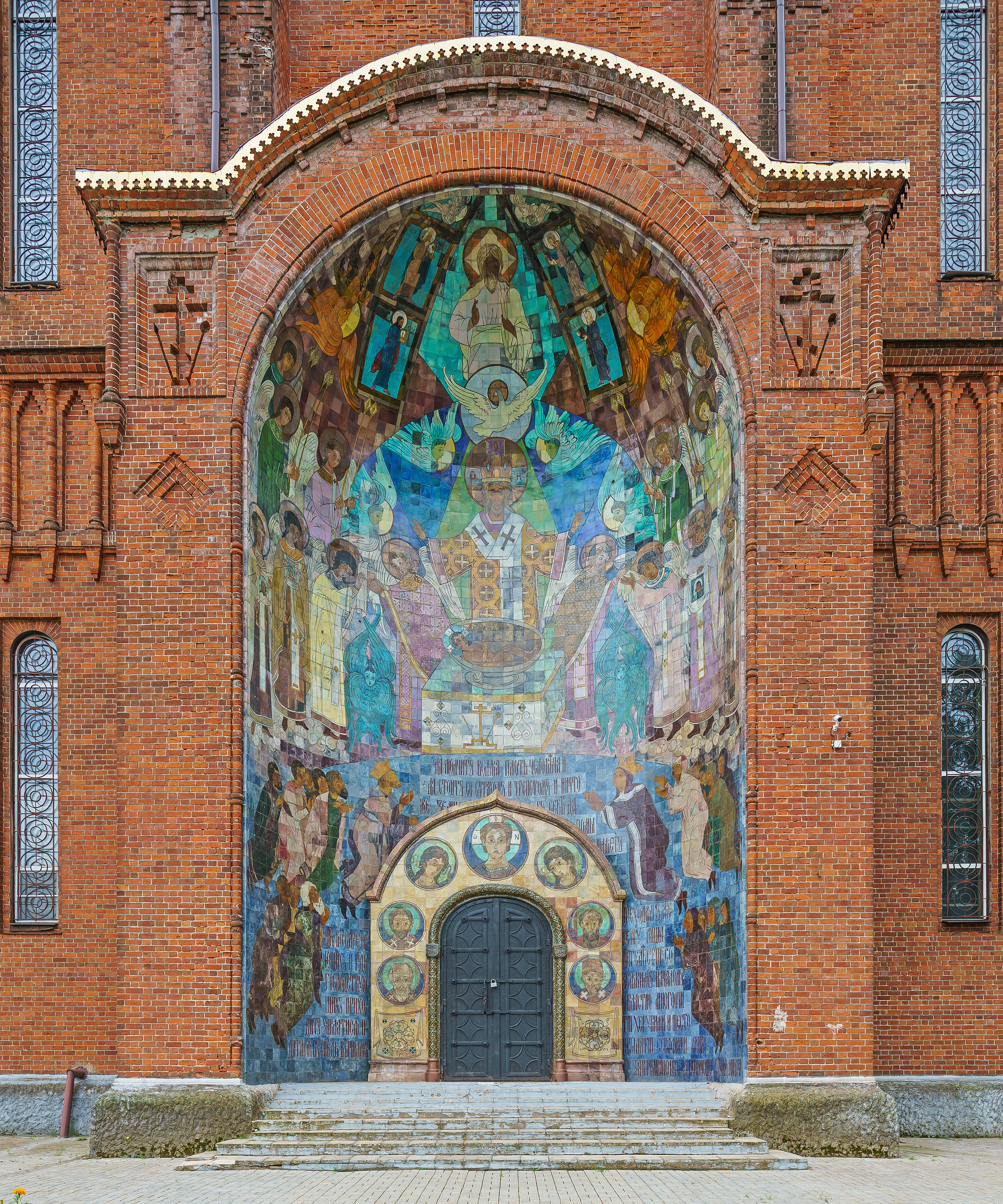
Maiolica mural at Resurrection church by masters of Abramtsevo Colony in Vichuga (1880s)

Most Art Nouveau churches in Russian Empire are also related to Russian Revival style. One of the most notable is Marfo-Mariinsky Convent in Moscow, katholikon of which was commissioned by Grand Duchess Elizabeth Feodorovna (born near Darmstadt that was the center of Jugendstil at the time) and built by Alexey Shchusev in 1908-1912. He also built many other churches with similar features, e.g. the Trinity Cathedral of Lavra (1906-1912) in Pochayiv featuring mosaics and paintings by Nicholas Roerich, churches in Natalyevka estate (1911-1913), at the sight of the Battle of Kulikovo (1913—1917).

Another church with mosaics by Nicholas Roerich is the Church of the Holy Spirit (1903–1906) in Talashkino art colony by Sergey Malyutin. The other art colony of Russia, Abramtsevo Colony, was known for its use of maiolica. In religious buildings in can be found at the Resurrection church (1908–11) in Vichuga.

While the former churches are Orthodox, there were numerous Old Believers churches built throughout the Empire as the restriction to build them was withdrawn in 1905. Two churches were built by Ilya Bondarenko in Moscow. Franz (Fyodor) Schechtel built an Old Believers chapel at the upper floor of the house of tycoon Stepan Ryabushinsky.

As Saint Petersburg was situated close to the border with Grand Duchy of Finland, there was a strong influence of its National Romantic style on local Art Nouveau Architecture, to temples as well. In Russian National Romantic style is called Severny modern literally meaning "Northern Art Nouveau". Though the Saint Petersburg Mosque (1909-1920) by Nikolai Vasilyev has Iranian architecture, some of its features are clearly National Romantic.

== Art Nouveau churches of the United States ==
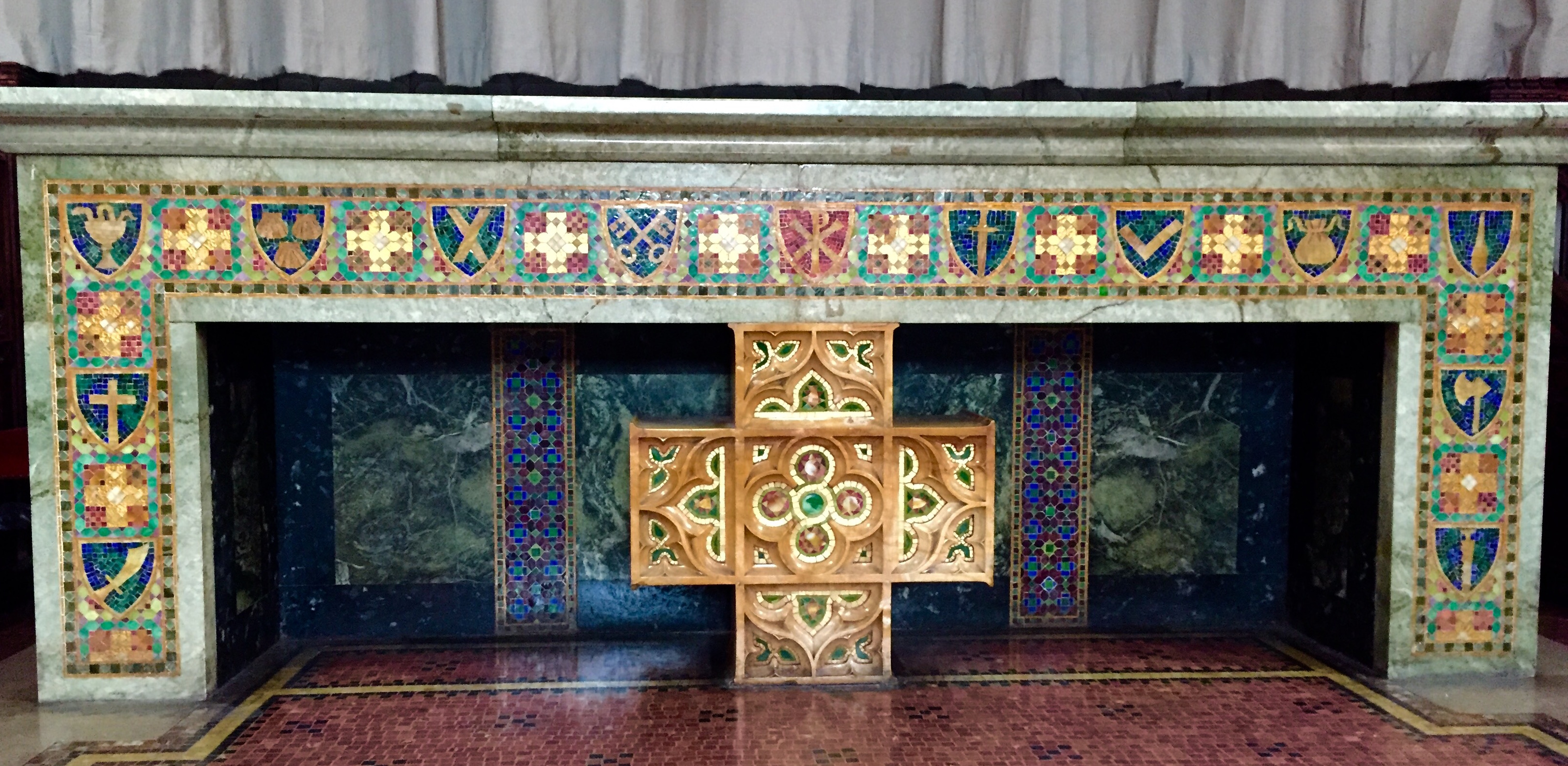
Altar of Fourth Universalist Society in the City of New York by Louis Comfort Tiffany

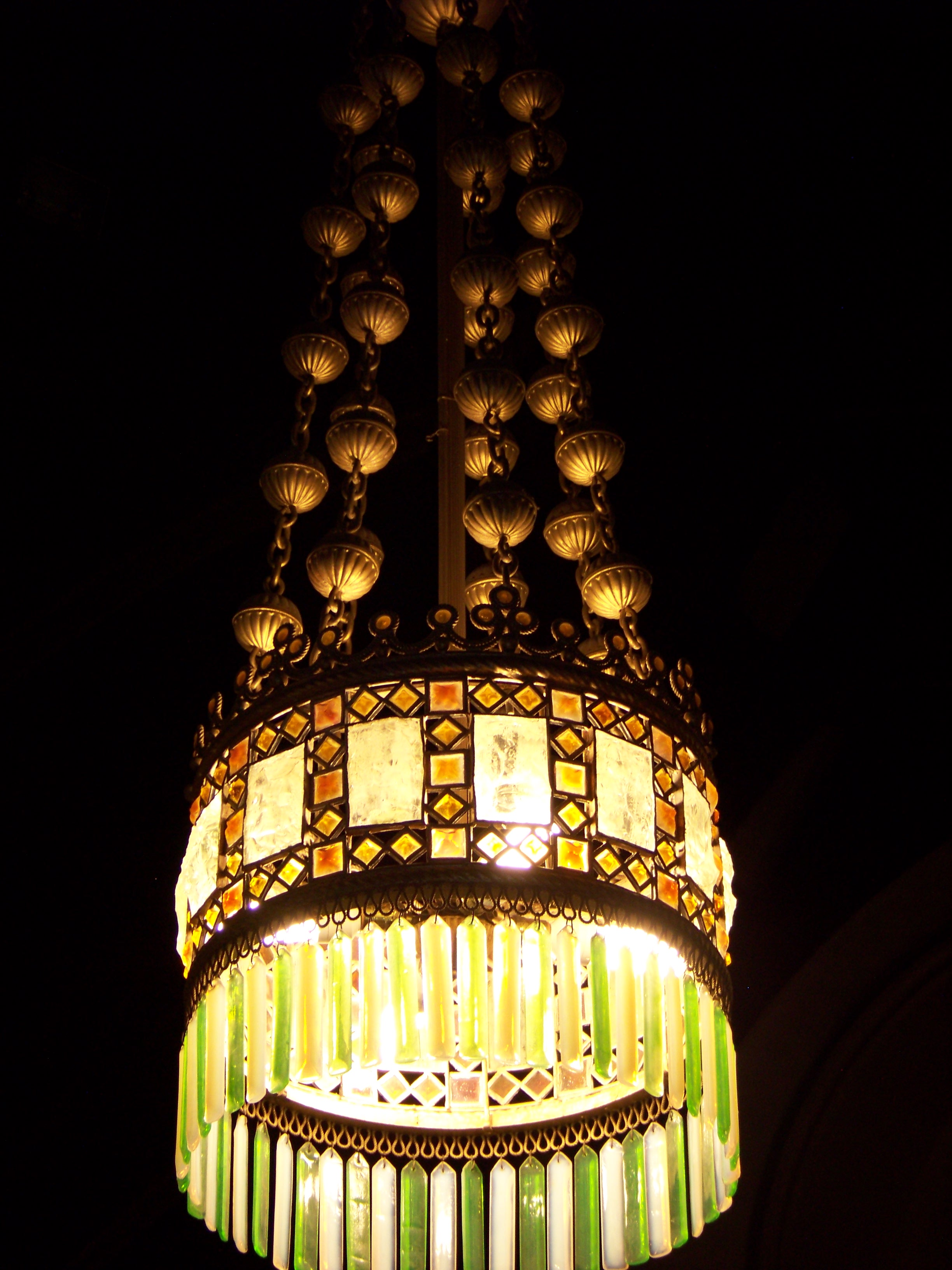
A lamp at Willard Memorial Chapel by Louis Comfort Tiffany in Auburn, New York

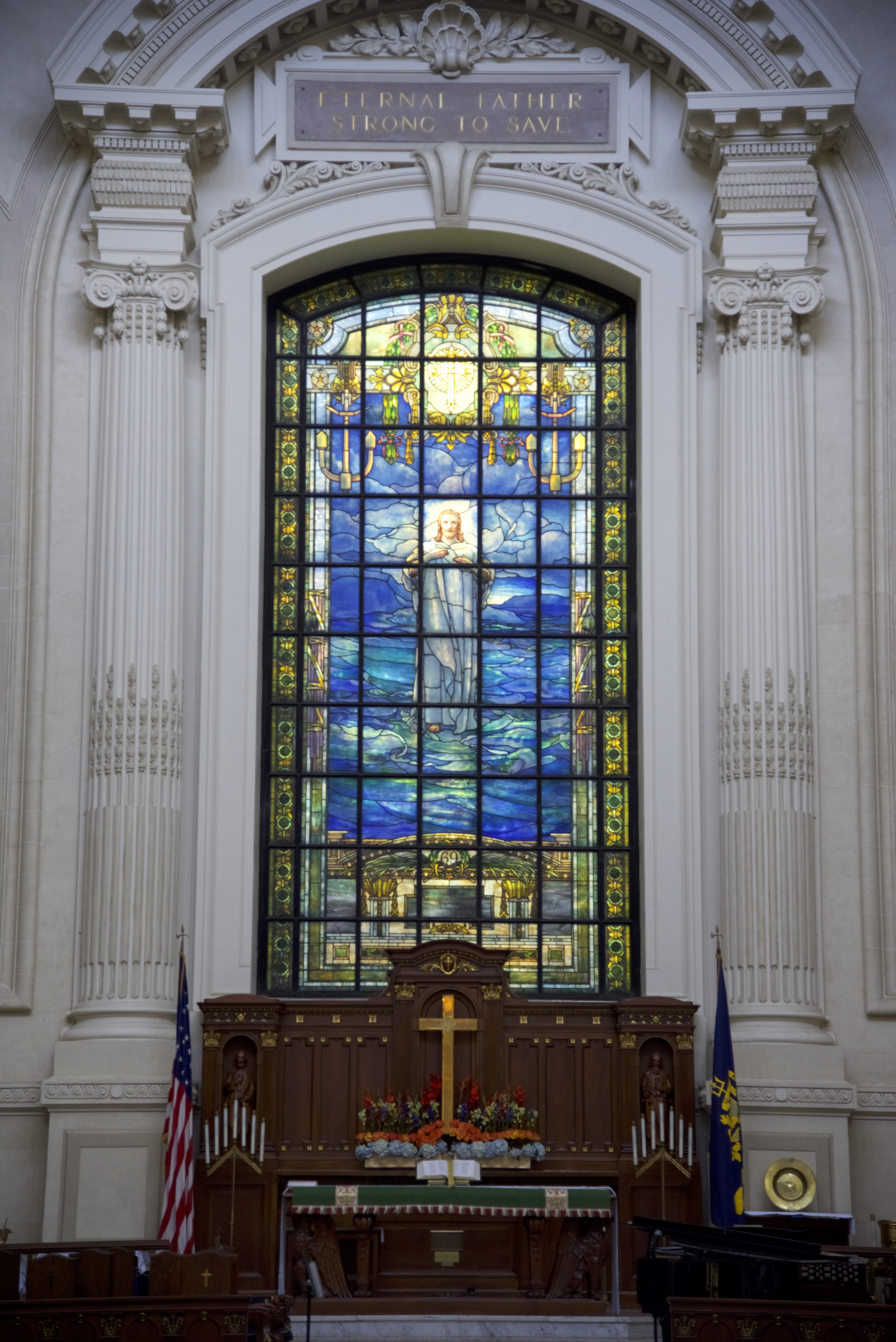
The Christ on the Waters stained glass window at Naval Academy Chapel by Frederick Wilson in Annapolis, Maryland

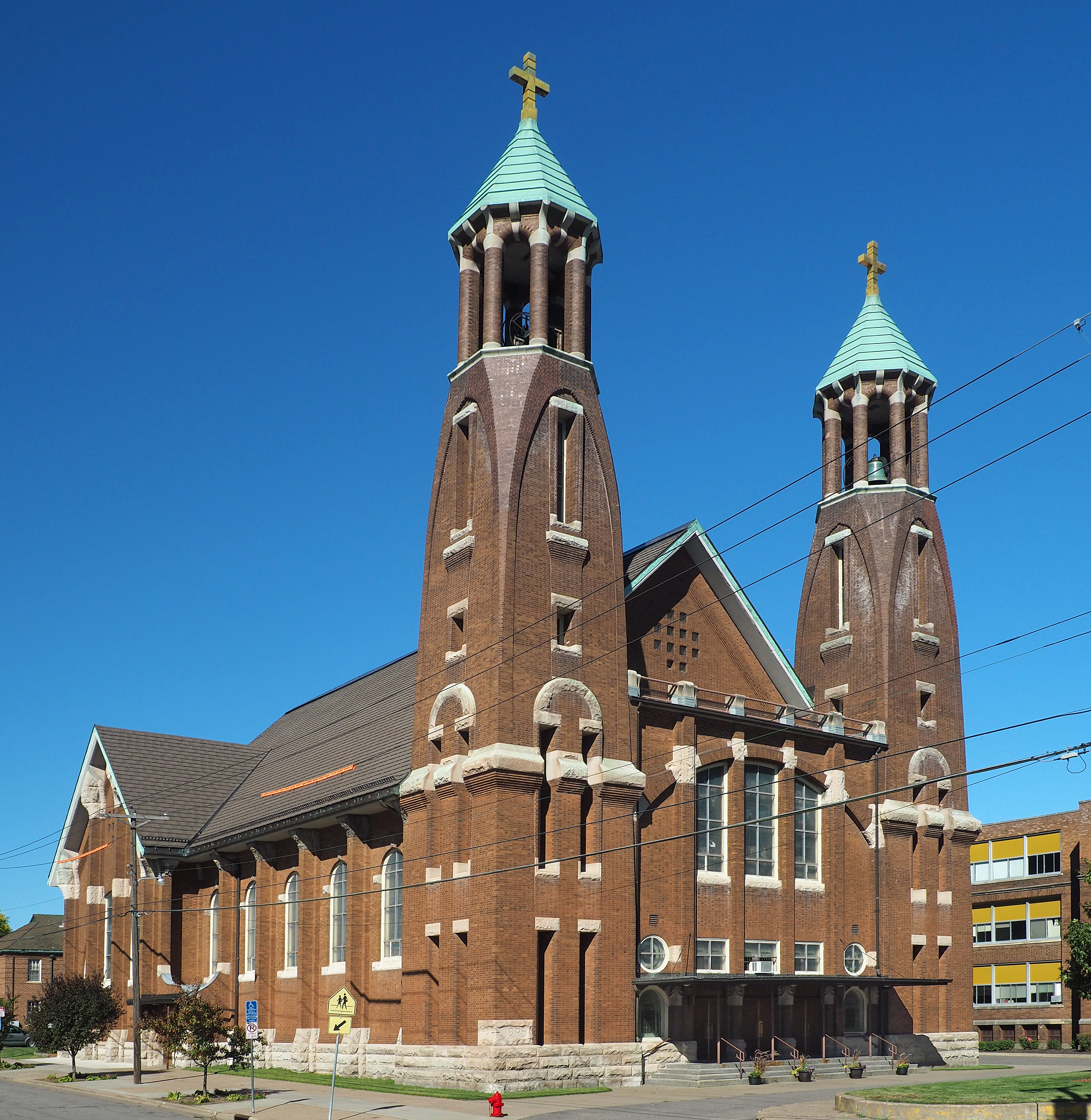
Church of St. Bernard by John Jager in Saint Paul, Minnesota

Several churches and chapels in the United States have interior details crafted by Louis Comfort Tiffany:

- Altar: Fourth Universalist Society in the City of New York,
- Stained glass windows and interior: Willard Memorial Chapel (1892-1894) in Auburn, New York
- Stained glass windows:
  - Brown Memorial Presbyterian Church in Baltimore (1905),
  - First Presbyterian Church, Lockport, NY
  - Arlington Street Church in Boston (1899-1929)
  - Pullman Memorial Universalist Church, Albion, NY
  - Second Presbyterian Church in Chicago
  - Wade Memorial Chapel in Cleveland

Tiffany's chief designer for ecclesiastical windows was Frederick Wilson. He also designed windows for at least five other firms. Notable examples can be found e.g. in Naval Academy Chapel in Annapolis.

Louis Comfort Tiffany also designed the whole interior for the Tiffany Chapel, first installed for the 1893 World's Columbian Exposition in Chicago and now on public display at the Charles Hosmer Morse Museum of American Art in Winter Park, Florida.

A notable mix of the Prairie School and Art Nouveau styles is the Church of St. Bernard (1905–1914) by John Jager in Saint Paul, Minnesota.

== Liberty churches in Italy ==
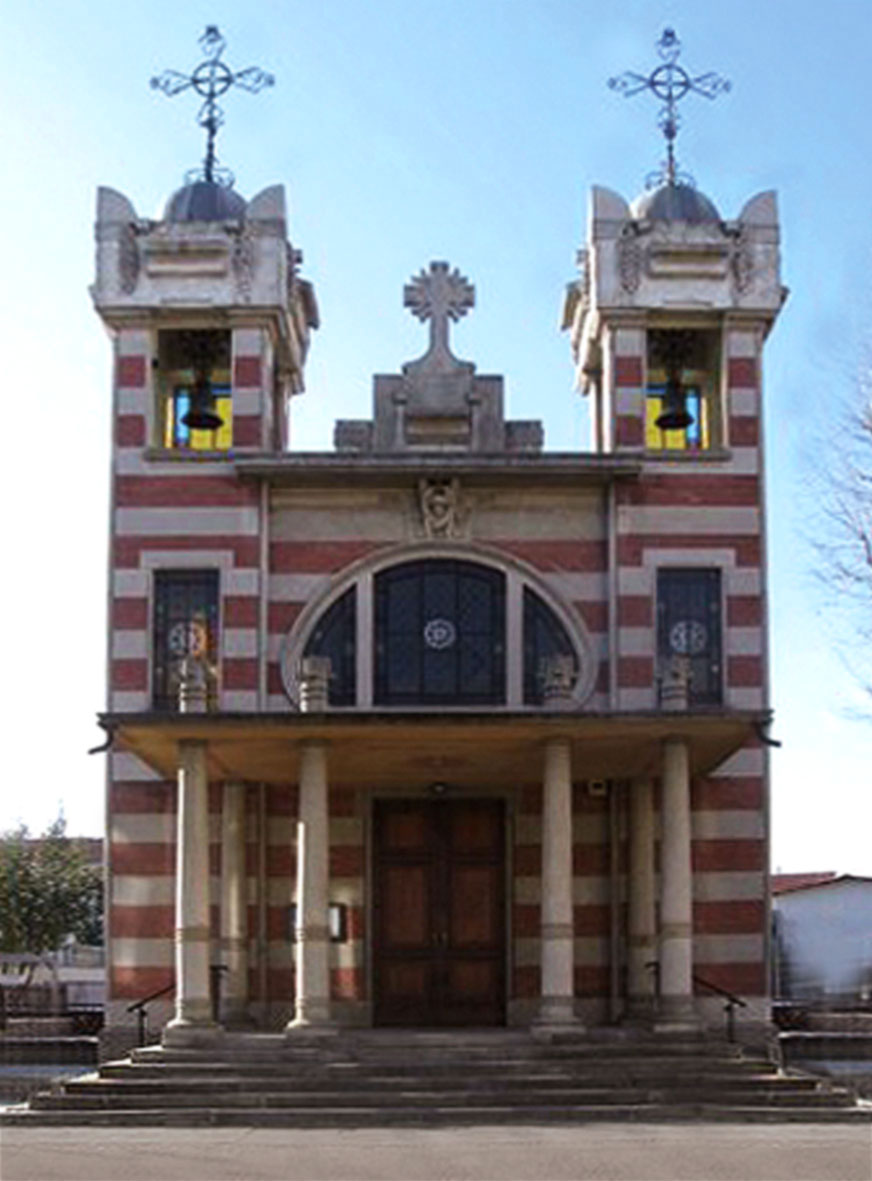
Church of Saint Elizabeth in Villaggio Leumann, Collegno, near Turin, Italy.

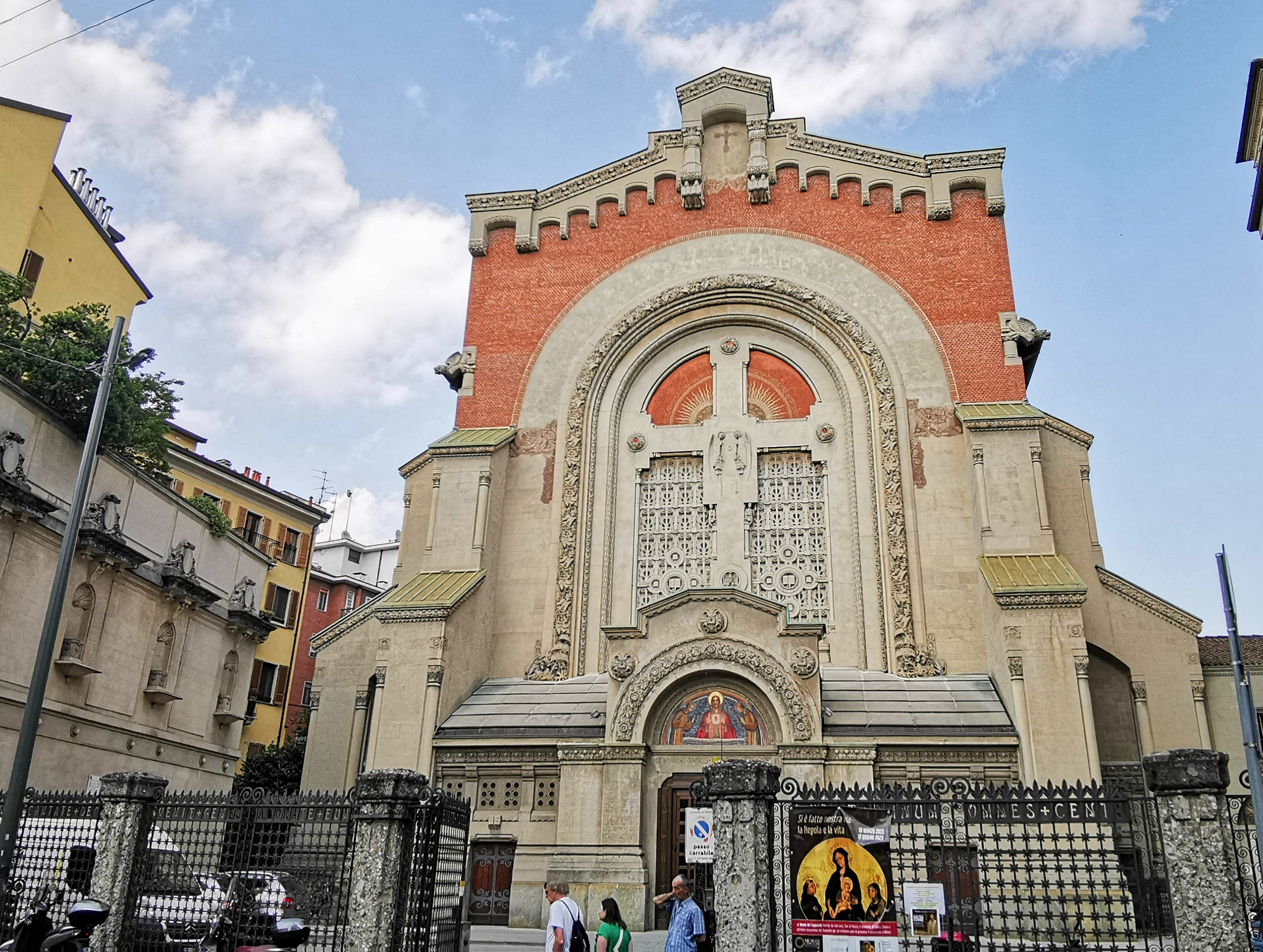
Church of Sacred Heart in Milan, Italy.

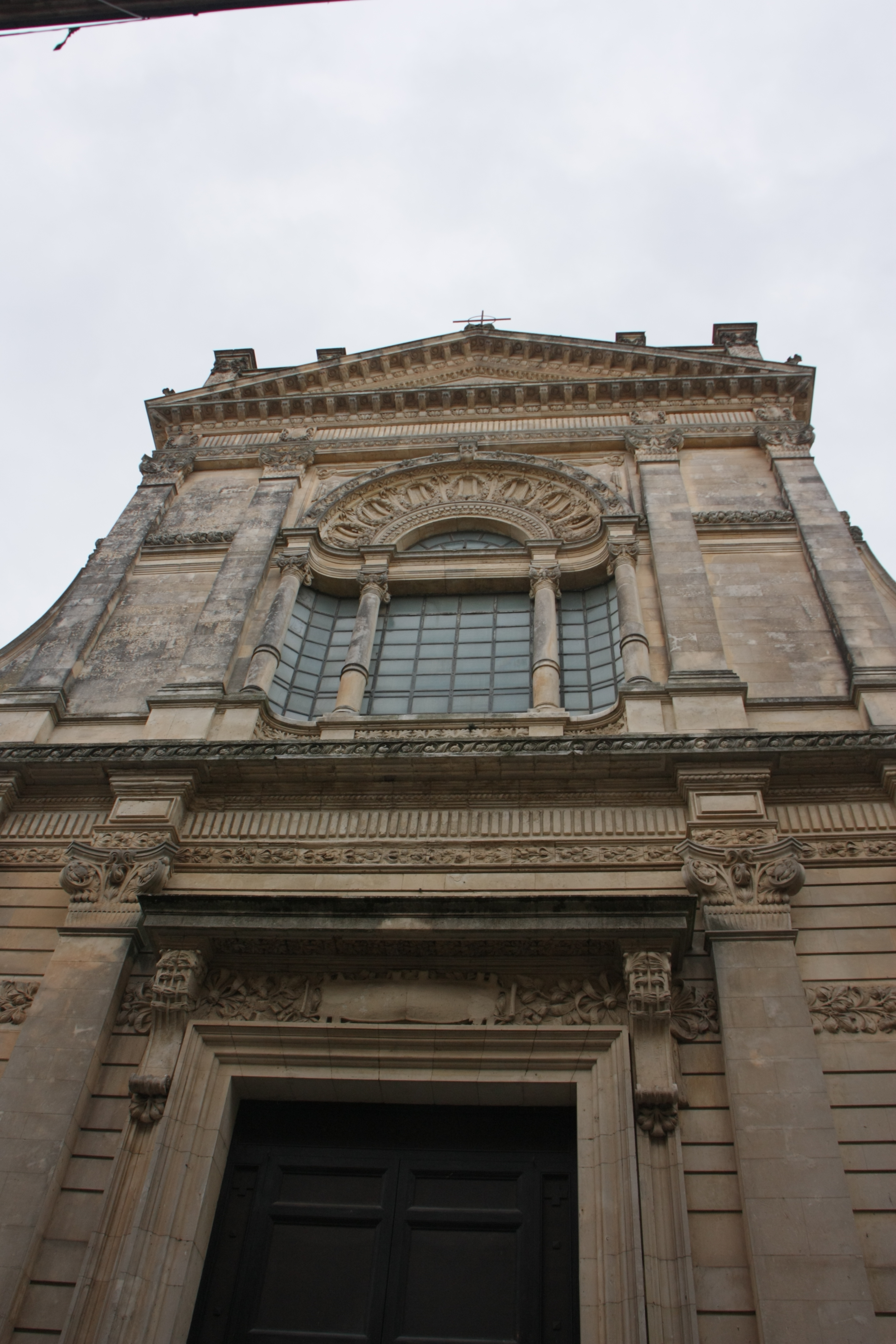
Façade of the Cathedral of Saint Julian in Caltagirone, Sicily, Italy.
