= Schauet doch und sehet, ob irgend ein Schmerz sei, BWV 46 =

1723 church cantata by J. S. Bach

Schauet doch und sehet, ob irgend ein Schmerz sei
- BWV 46
- Church cantata by J. S. Bach
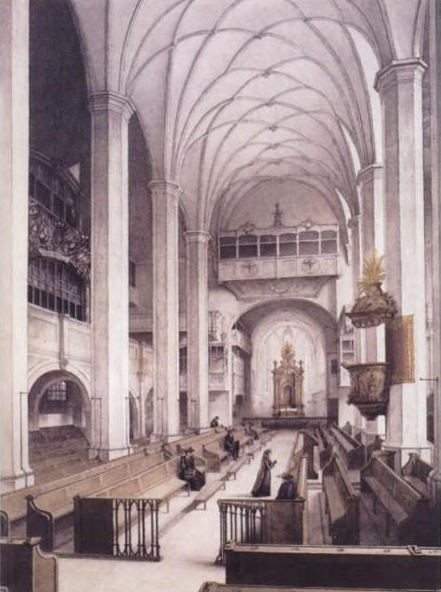
- Thomaskirche, Leipzig
- Related: Qui tollis peccata mundi of the Mass in B minor
- Occasion: Tenth Sunday after Trinity
- Bible text: Lamentations 1:12
- Chorale: by Johann Matthäus Meyfart
- Performed: 1 August 1723: Leipzig
- Movements: six
- Vocal: SATB choir; solo: alto, tenor and bass
- Instrumental: corno da tirarsi; 2 flauti dolci; 2 oboes da caccia; 2 violins; viola; continuo

Schauet doch und sehet, ob irgend ein Schmerz sei (Behold and see, if there be any sorrow), BWV 46, is a church cantata by Johann Sebastian Bach. He composed it for the tenth Sunday after Trinity and it was first performed on 1 August 1723 in Leipzig.

The cantata is part of Bach's first cantata cycle, which he began when he took up office as Thomaskantor in May 1723. The topic is based on the prescribed reading from the gospel of Luke, Jesus announcing the destruction of Jerusalem and cleansing of the Temple. The librettist is unknown. The cantata is structured in six movements: two choral movements frame a sequence of alternating recitatives and arias. The opening movement is based on a verse from the Book of Lamentations, a lament of the destructed Jerusalem, related to the announcement from the gospel. The text moves from reflecting God's wrath in the past to the situation of the contemporary Christian. The closing chorale, the ninth stanza from Johann Matthäus Meyfart's hymn "O großer Gott von Macht", is a prayer culminating in the thought "do not repay us according to our sins".

The cantata is scored for three vocal soloists (alto, tenor and bass), a four-part choir, and a Baroque instrumental ensemble of a corno da tirarsi (possibly a slide trumpet), two flauti dolci (recorders), two oboes da caccia, strings and basso continuo. This is an unusually rich instrumentation for an ordinary Sunday. Bach created in the opening chorus an unusual "uncompromising" fugue for up to nine parts. The bass aria with an obbligato trumpet, depicting God's wrath compared to a thunderstorm, has been regarded as "more frightening" than any contemporary operatic 'rage' arias. The closing chorale is not the usual simple four-part setting, but includes instrumental interludes reminiscent of motifs used before.

Bach used music of the first section of the opening chorus for Qui tollis peccata mundi of his Mass in B minor. He made considerable changes when he adapted the lamenting music to depict the Lamb of God carrying the sins of the world.

== History and words ==
Bach composed the cantata in his first year as Thomaskantor in Leipzig for the Tenth Sunday after Trinity, the eleventh cantata of his first cantata cycle. The prescribed readings for the Sunday were from the First Epistle to the Corinthians, different gifts, but one spirit (1 Corinthians 12:1–11), and from the gospel of Luke, Jesus announcing the destruction of Jerusalem and cleansing of the Temple (Luke 19:41–48).

As with other cantatas Bach composed in his first years in Leipzig, we do not know the identity of the librettist. It is the third in a group of ten cantatas following the same structure of biblical text (in this case from the Old Testament) – recitative – aria – recitative – aria – chorale. The ten cantatas were dedicated to the 8th to 14th and 21st to 22nd Sunday after Trinity and the second Sunday after Easter.

The words for the first movement are taken from the Book of Lamentations (Lamentations 1:12), a lament about the historic destruction of Jerusalem. The text, suitable in connection with the announcement by Jesus, is among the prescribed readings for Good Friday and has been set to music often. The text for the inner movements 2 to 5 were written by the unknown poet, who dedicated a pair of recitative and aria to the memory of the historic event, another pair to the warning that the contemporary Christian is threatened in a similar way. The final chorale is the ninth stanza of "O großer Gott von Macht" by Johann Matthäus Meyfart.

Bach led the Thomanerchor and instrumentalists in the first performance on 1 August 1723.

== Music ==
=== Structure and scoring ===
The cantata is structured in six movements and scored for three vocal soloists (alto (A), tenor (T) and bass (B)), a four-part choir (SATB), and a Baroque instrumental ensemble of a corno da tirarsi (Zugtrompete, Tr), mostly doubling the choir soprano, two recorders (Fl), two oboes da caccia (Oc), two violins (Vl), viola (Va) and basso continuo (Bc). This is an unusually rich instrumentation for an ordinary Sunday. The duration is given as 20 minutes. The title on the original parts reads: "10 post Trinit: / Schauet doch und sehet, ob irgend ein etc. / a / 4 Voci / 1 Tromba / 2 Flauti / 2 Hautb: da Caccia / 2 Violini / Viola / con / Continuo / di Sign: / J.S.Bach".

In the following table of the movements, the scoring and keys and time signatures are taken from Alfred Dürr, using the symbol for common time (4/4). The instruments are shown separately for winds and strings. The regular continuo is not shown, playing in most movements but not in movement 5.

Movements of Schauet doch und sehet, ob irgend ein Schmerz sei
No.	Title	Text	Type	Vocal	Winds	Strings	Key	Time
1	Schauet doch und sehet, ob irgend ein Schmerz sei	Lamentations 1:12	Chorus	SATB	Tr 2Fl 2Oc	2Vl Va	D minor	3/4
2	So klage du, zerstörte Gottesstadt	anon.	Recitative	T	2 Fl	2Vl Va		common time
3	Dein Wetter zog sich auf von weiten	anon.	Aria	B	Tr	2Vl Va	B-flat major	3/4
4	Doch bildet euch, o Sünder, ja nicht ein	anon.	Recitative	A				common time
5	Doch Jesus will auch bei der Strafe	anon.	Aria	A	2Fl 2Oc		G minor	common time
6	O großer Gott von Treu	Meyfart	Chorale	SATB	Tr 2Fl	2Vl Va	G minor	common time

=== Movements ===
==== 1 ====
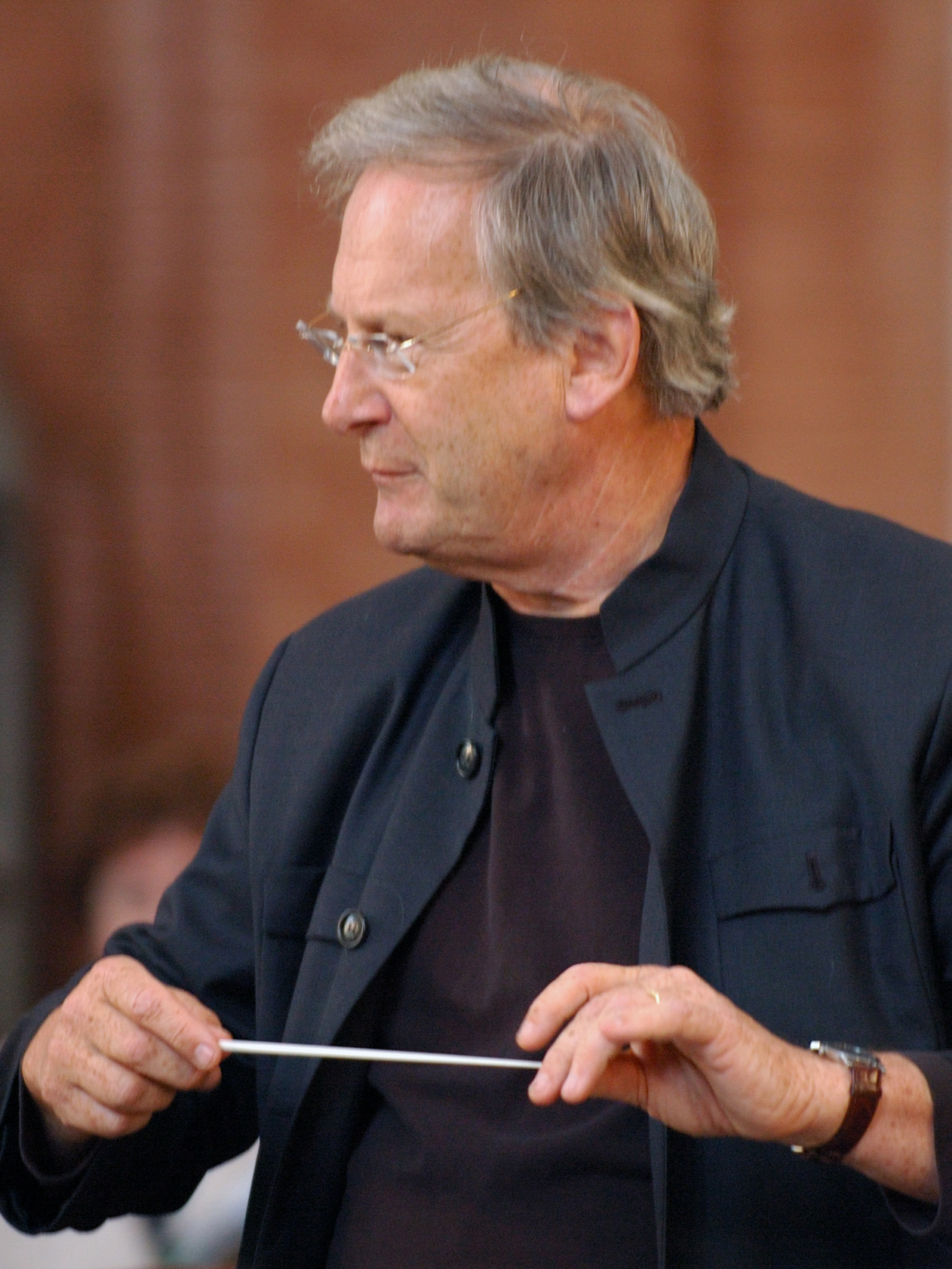
John Eliot Gardiner, who conducted the Bach Cantata Pilgrimage, in 2007

The first movement, "Schauet doch und sehet ob irgend ein Schmerz sei" (Behold and see if there be any sorrow), is an expansive lamento in two sections. The text, part of the prescribed responsories for Good Friday, has been set by many composers, including Tomás Luis de Victoria, Carlo Gesualdo and Handel who set it as a tenor arioso in Messiah.

The two sections of the movement are essentially a prelude and fugue. The prelude begins with 16 measures of instrumental music, with the strings "engaged in a persistent sobbing commentary", to quote John Eliot Gardiner, who conducted the Bach Cantata Pilgrimage in 2000 and performed this cantata in Brunswick Cathedral. Following this introduction is a first round of vocal entries, and then a more intense second round in which each entry is doubled by a wind instrument. The musicologist Julian Mincham notes the various ways by which Bach conveys the idea of lamentation: "There is frequent stressing of the word "Schmerz" (sorrow). Suspensions and dissonant seventh chords in the harmony add to the tension, as do the uses of the highly expressive Neapolitan chord and false relations". The fugue, marked "Un poco allegro", sets the second line of the responsory text, which translates as, "For the Lord has made me full of anguish on the day of His wrathful anger." The fugue builds from a single vocal line accompanied by continuo to eventually involve all the voices and instruments in six-part counterpoint. Gardiner writes: "It is uncompromising in its contrapuntal wildness and grim, dissonant harmony."

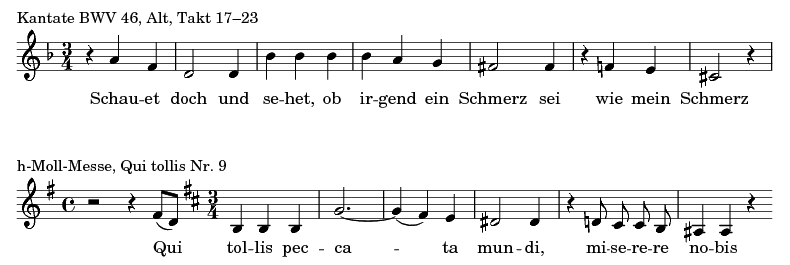
The beginning of the first vocal entry in the cantata movement and the beginning of Qui tollis peccata mundi in the mass

In 1733 an official period of mourning for August the Strong provided opportunities for the performance of music expressive of grief. When Bach wrote his Missa (Kyrie and Gloria) in B minor, he reworked the first part of the movement and incorporated it into the Qui tollis peccata mundi in the Gloria. The lamenting music depicts the Lamb of God carrying the sins of the world. In adapting the earlier music to its new function in the Mass, Bach transposed it from D minor to B minor, used transverse flutes instead of the recorders, dropped the instrumental opening and added a repetitive bass-line.

==== 2 ====
A tenor recitative, "So klage du, zerstörte Gottesstadt" (Lament then, O destroyed city of God), is accompanied by the recorders and the strings. The recorders play "five-note mourning figures" which may depict the tears of Jesus mourning the fall of Jerusalem. Mincham notes that Bach "experiments with instrumentation in a way that lends colour and expressive depth", adding that "it is equally likely that these iridescent twinkles are symbolic; flickering feelings of uncertainty within a demolished world".

==== 3 ====
The first aria, "Dein Wetter zog sich auf von weiten" (Your storm arose from far off), is assigned to the bass voice, and dramatically depicts the outbreak of a thunderstorm. It is the only part of the cantata where the trumpet appears in a solo function, as a symbol of divine majesty. The strings and continuo depict the "roaring thunder and lightning striking the earth". Mincham writes about the double image: "The bass aria is, indeed, a graphic musical portrait of a thunderstorm as well as an allegorical portrayal of God′s anger and fury". Gardiner regards the aria as "more frightening than any operatic 'rage' aria of the time by, say, Vivaldi or Handel".

==== 4 ====
"'Doch bildet euch, o Sünder, ja nicht ein" (Yet do not imagine, o sinners). Mincham observes that "Bach,... using the minimum of resource[s]... still manages to create the maximum effect" -- For example, in the last measures -- in contrast to the calm beginning -- "the harmony becomes more obscure, the bass-line less conjunct, and the alto line more passionate".

==== 5 ====
The aria "Doch Jesus will auch bei der Strafe" (Yet Jesus will, even in punishment), is scored for "the alto voice, surrounded and encompassed by instruments of contrasting but complementary timbres" -- namely the oboes, playing in unison, and the two recorders; there is no continuo. (Interestingly, another aria without continuo -- for soprano, about the "conscience of the sinner" -- had appeared in the same position within the previous Sunday's cantata, Herr, gehe nicht ins Gericht mit deinem Knecht, BWV 105. Here Jesus is portrayed as the Good Shepherd, caring for his flock: "Er sammelt sie als seine Schafe, als seine Küchlein liebreich ein" (He gathers them as his sheep, Lovingly, as his little chicks).

==== 6 ====
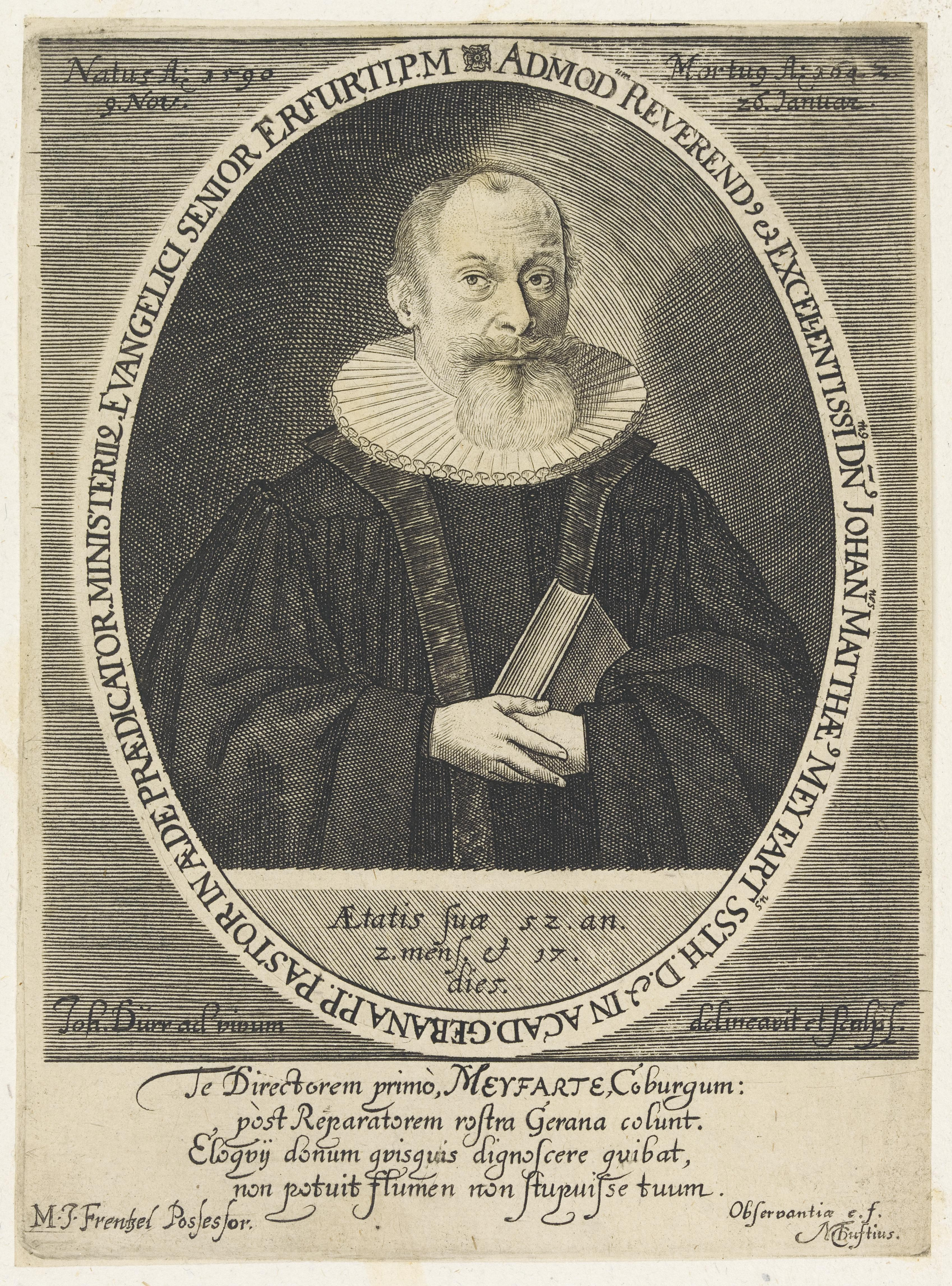
Johann Matthäus Meyfart, the poet of the hymn

The closing movement, "O großer Gott von Treu" (O great God of faithfulness), is a four-part setting of the ninth stanza of the chorale "O großer Gott von Macht" by Johann Matthäus Meyfart, to which Bach has added "isolated little episodes" for the recorders, which are reminiscent of the motifs of mourning heard in movement 2. The interpolation of instrumental episodes is a feature this movement shares with the closing movement of 'Herr, gehe nicht ins Gericht mit deinem Knecht' ', BWV 105, the cantata Bach had composed a week earlier.

O großer Gott von Treu,
Weil vor dir niemand gilt
Als dein Sohn Jesus Christ,
Der deinen Zorn gestillt,
So sieh doch an die Wunden sein,
Sein Marter, Angst und schwere Pein;
Um seinetwillen schone,
Uns nicht nach Sünden lohne.

Translation:

O great God of faithfulness,
since before You no one is worthy
other than Your Son, Jesus Christ,
Who calms Your anger,
so look upon His wounds,
His martyrdom, anguish, and heavy pain;
and spare us, for His sake;
do not repay us according to our sins.

== Recordings ==
The listing is taken from the selection on the Bach Cantatas website. Ensembles playing period instruments in historically informed performance are shown with green background.

Recordings of Schauet doch und sehet, ob irgend ein Schmerz sei
Title	Conductor / Choir / Orchestra	Soloists	Label	Year	Orch. type
Radio Recording - Archiv-Nr: U0-04073	Max Thurn Members of NDR Chor Members of Hamburger Rundfunkorchester	Ursula Zollenkopf; Helmut Kretschmar; Rudolf Bautz	NDR	1958	
J. S. Bach: Cantatas BWV 46 & BWV 65	Helmut Kahlhöfer Kantorei Barmen-Gemarke Barmen Chamber Orchestra	Lotte Wolf-Matthäus; Georg Jelden; Jakob Stämpfli	Cantate	1960	Chamber
J. S. Bach: Das Kantatenwerk · Complete Cantatas · Les Cantates, Folge / Vol. 12 – BWV 43–46	Gustav Leonhardt Knabenchor Hannover Leonhardt-Consort	René Jacobs; Kurt Equiluz; Hanns-Friedrich Kunz	Telefunken	1975	Period
Die Bach Kantate Vol. 46	Helmuth Rilling Gächinger Kantorei Bach-Collegium Stuttgart	Helen Watts; Adalbert Kraus; Wolfgang Schöne	Hänssler	1976	
J. S. Bach: Complete Cantatas Vol. 8	Ton Koopman Amsterdam Baroque Choir Amsterdam Baroque Orchestra	Bogna Bartosz; Jörg Dürmüller; Klaus Mertens	Antoine Marchand	1998	Period
J. S. Bach: Cantatas Vol. 11 – Cantatas from Leipzig 1723 IV – BWV 46, 95, 136, 138	Masaaki Suzuki Bach Collegium Japan	Kai Wessel; Makoto Sakurada; Peter Kooy	BIS	1998	Period
Bach Edition Vol. 12 – Cantatas Vol. 11	Pieter Jan Leusink Holland Boys Choir Netherlands Bach Collegium	Sytse Buwalda; Knut Schoch; Bas Ramselaar	Brilliant Classics	1999	Period
Bach Cantatas Vol. 5: Rendsburg/Braunschweig / For the 8th Sunday after Trinity / For the 10th Sunday after Trinity	John Eliot Gardiner Monteverdi Choir English Baroque Soloists	Daniel Taylor; Christoph Genz; Gotthold Schwarz	Soli Deo Gloria	2000	Period
