= Eldar =

- Gender: Male

Origin
- Meaning: Fire, country/society possessor, ruler, God resides

Eldar is a masculine given name and surname of various origins.

In Scandinavian countries, the name means "the one of fire," derived from the North Germanic languages.

The name is also popular in the former countries of the Soviet Union, especially among the Turkic population, where it is understood to mean "country/society possessor" or "ruler."

In the Balkans, Eldar is popular among Bosniaks in the former Yugoslav nations and is also used among Albanians. Its popularity among these groups may be influenced by other similar popular names, such as Elvir, Elvin, and Elmir.

In Hebrew, the name means "God resides," and it is used as a surname among Jews in Israel.

== Given name ==
- Eldar Abdulayev (born 1985), Kazakhstani ice hockey forward
- Eldar Assanov (born 1974), Ukrainian freestyle wrestler
- Eldar Azizov (born 1957), Azerbaijani politician, Baku Mayor
- Eldar Ćivić (born 1996), Bosnian footballer
- Eldar Djangirov (born 1987), American jazz pianist
- Eldar Efendijev (born 1954), Estonian-Azerbaijani politician
- Eldar Elgrably (1986-2020), Israeli dancer and choreographer
- Eldar Gasanov (born 1982), Ukrainian chess grandmaster
- Eldar Gasimov (born 1989), Azerbaijani singer
- Eldar Getokov (born 1986), Russian footballer
- Eldar Guliyev (born 1951), Azerbaijani politician
- Eldar Quliyev (1941–2021), Azerbaijani film director
- Eldar Hansen (born 1941), Norwegian footballer
- Eldar Hasanović (born 1990), Bosnian footballer
- Eldar Hasanov (born 1955), Azerbaijani politician
- Eldar Kuliev (1951–2017), Soviet film director
- Eldar Kurtanidze (born 1972), Georgian wrestler and political activist
- Eldar Mahmudov (born 1956), Azerbaijani politician
- Eldar Mamayev (born 1985), Russian footballer
- Eldar R. Mamedov (born 1990), Russian footballer
- Eldar Mammadov (born 1968), Azerbaijani military figure
- Eldar Mansurov (born 1952), Azerbaijani musician and composer
- Eldar Memišević (born 1992), Bosnian-born Qatari handball player
- Eldar Mikayilzade (born 1956), Azerbaijani designer and visual artist; known for carpet design
- Eldar Namazov (born 1956), Azerbaijani politician
- Eldar Nebolsin (born 1974), Uzbekistani pianist
- Eldar Nizamutdinov (born 1981), Russian footballer
- Eldar Quliyev (1941–2021), Soviet Azerbaijani film director
- Eldar Rønning (born 1982), Norwegian cross-country skier
- Eldar Ryazanov (1927–2015), Soviet Russian film director
- Eldar Sætre (born 1956), Norwegian businessman
- Eldar Sattarov (born 1973), Kazakhstani writer
- Eldar Shengelaia (1933–2025), Soviet Georgian film director and screenwriter
- Eldar Vågan (born 1960), Norwegian musician and Illustrator

== Surname ==
- Akiva Eldar (born 1945), Israeli political analyst, author and journalist
- David Eldar (born 1989), Australian Scrabble and poker player
- Shlomi Eldar (born 1957), Israeli television journalist and film maker
- Yonina Eldar (born 1973), Israeli professor of electrical engineering

== Fiction ==
- A division of the Elves in Tolkien's Middle-earth; see Sundering of the Elves § Eldar
- Aeldari (formerly known as Eldar), a race of elf-like aliens in Warhammer 40,000
- A race of ancient elves in The Riftwar Cycle by Raymond Feist
- A planet in the video game Star Ocean: The Last Hope

== Other ==
- Pinus brutia, a species of pine called the Eldar or Turkish pine
- Eldar Pine State Reserve, in Azerbaijan

== See also ==
- Aldar (disambiguation)
