= Tönet, ihr Pauken! Erschallet, Trompeten! BWV 214 =

Cantata by J.S. Bach

- Secular cantata by J. S. Bach
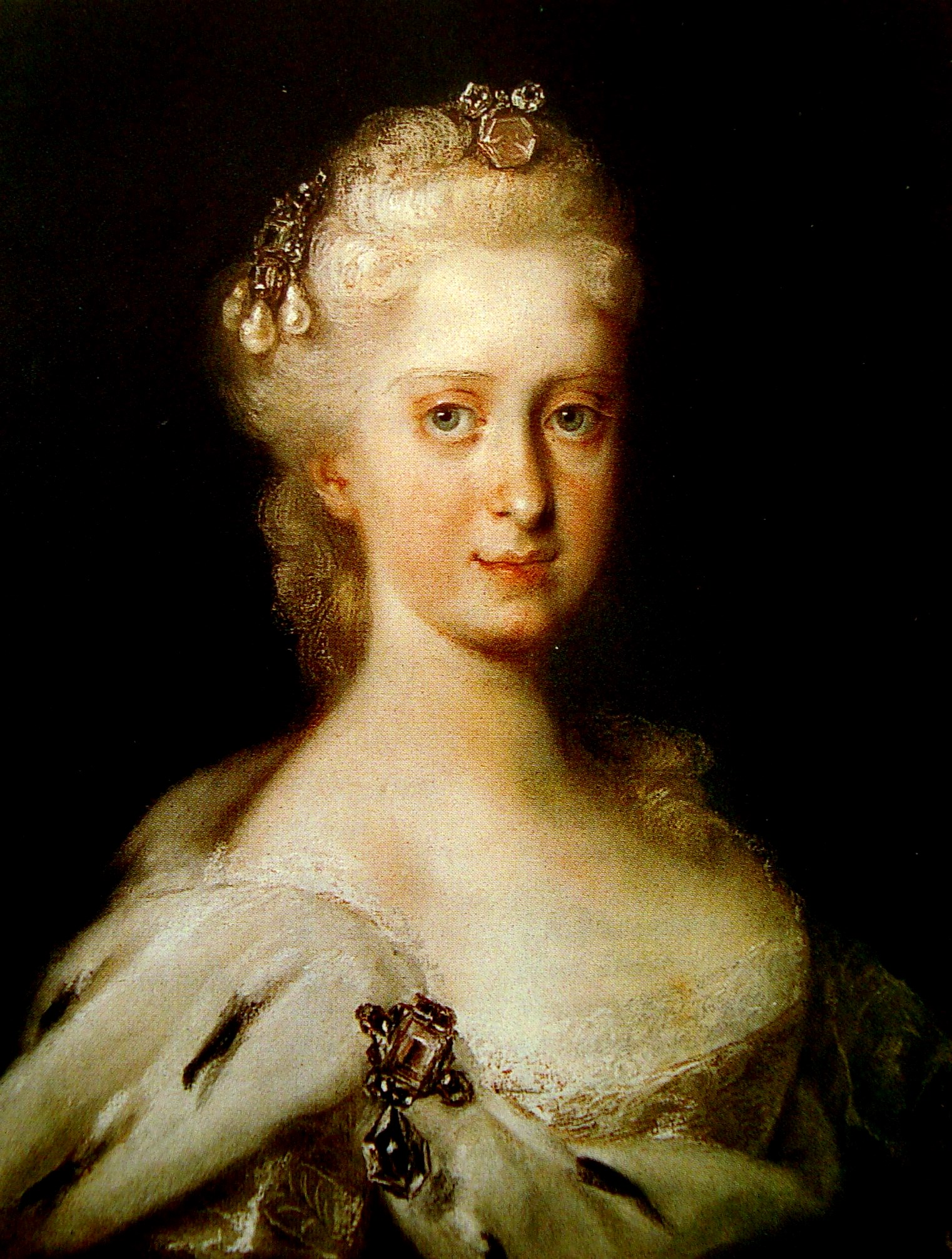
- Maria Josepha, the dedicatee, in a 1720 painting by Rosalba Carriera
- Performed: 8 December 1733: Leipzig
- Movements: 9
- Vocal: SATB choir and soloists
- Instrumental: 3 trumpets; timpani; 2 flauto traverso; 2 oboes; oboe d'amore; 2 violins; viola; cello; violone; continuo

Tönet, ihr Pauken! Erschallet, Trompeten! (Resound, ye drums! (Note: The German "Pauken" means timpani (kettledrums). It is usually translated as drums in singable versions.) Ring out, ye trumpets!), BWV 214, is a secular cantata by Johann Sebastian Bach, composed in 1733 for the birthday of Maria Josepha, Queen of Poland and Electress of Saxony. Classified in published editions as a dramma per musica, it is based on a libretto by an unknown author. The piece has the dedicatee addressed by allegorical figures representing Roman and Greek goddesses of war and peace. It is structured as nine movements, and scored for four vocal parts and a festive Baroque orchestra with trumpets, timpani, flutes, (Note: For Bach, flute meant flauto traverso.) oboes and strings. Choral movements frame a series of alternating recitatives and arias. Bach led the first performance with the Collegium Musicum at the Zimmermannsches Caffeehaus on 8 December 1733.

Tönet, ihr Pauken! was first published by the Bach Gesellschaft in 1887, as part of the first complete edition of Bach's works. It appeared in the Neue Bach-Ausgabe in 1962. It was first recorded by the Kantorei Barmen-Gemarke in 1961, and subsequently, as part of their complete sets of the secular cantatas, by the Amsterdam Baroque Orchestra & Choir and the Bach Collegium Japan.

Bach reused the music of the two choral movements and two arias a year later in his Christmas Oratorio, notably for the movements opening Part I, Jauchzet, frohlocket!, and Part III, Herrscher des Himmels.

== Background and text ==
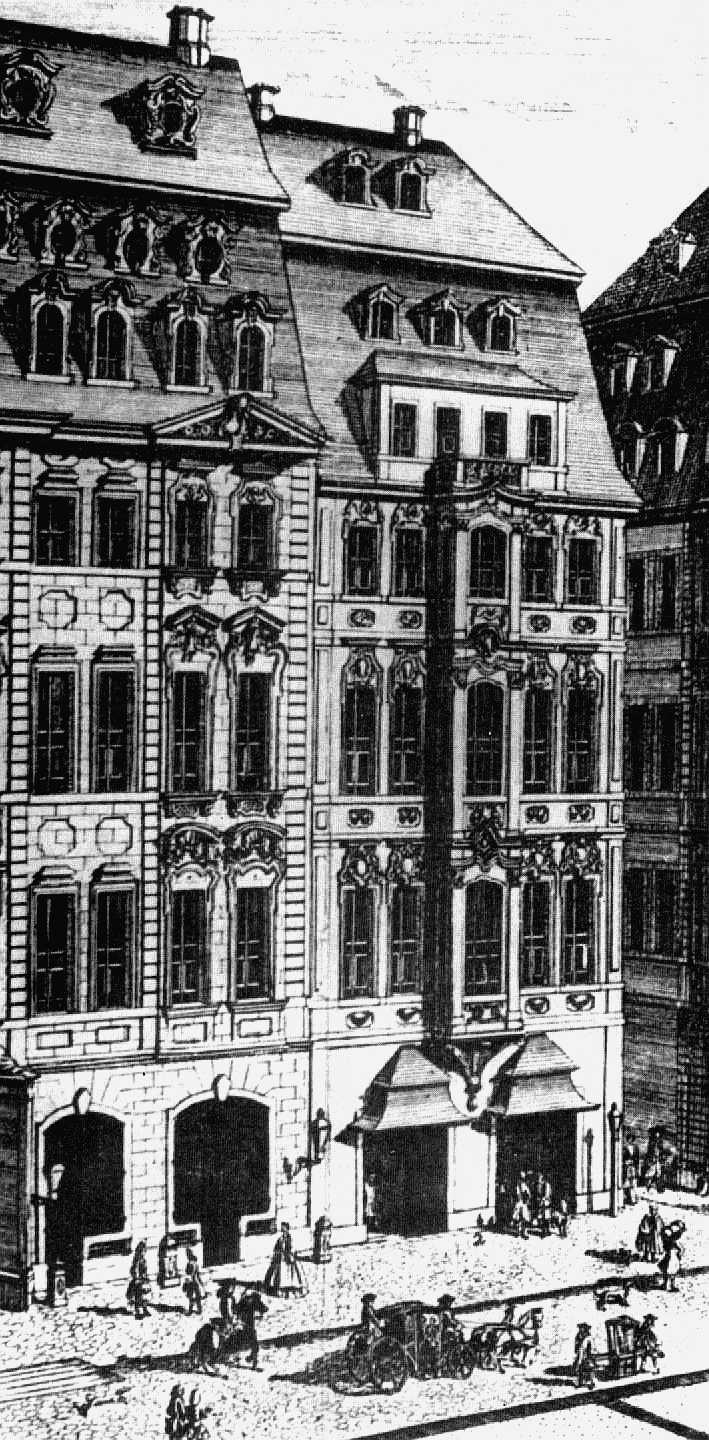
Zimmermannsches Caffeehaus, 1700s

Bach composed Tönet, ihr Pauken! in 1733, ten years after he became Thomaskantor in Leipzig, director of music in major churches in the town in the Electorate of Saxony. That year, Augustus succeeded his father as Elector of Saxony. Bach had hopes of being appointed composer to his court which was based in Dresden. He dedicated his Kyrie–Gloria Mass in B minor to the elector, a work which was to become the Kyrie and Gloria of his Mass in B minor. Bach also composed cantatas in honour of the elector's family, Laßt uns sorgen, laßt uns wachen, BWV 213, performed on 5 September 1733, the eleventh birthday of the son of the elector, and another for his wife, Maria Josepha. Bach composed Tönet, ihr Pauken! to honour the 34th birthday of Maria Josepha on 8 December. It is also known by the description Glückwunschkantate zum Geburtstage der Königin (Congratulation cantata for the Queen's birthday), although Maria Josepha was not crowned Queen of Poland until January 1734.

The librettist of the text is unknown. The action in the cantata is between four allegorical figures for goddesses from Roman and Greek mythology: Bellona, a Roman goddess of war, Pallas, a Greek goddess of wisdom and warfare, Irene, a Greek goddess of peace, and Fama, a Roman goddess of fame and rumor. Bach led the Collegium Musicum at the first performance at the Zimmermannsches Caffeehaus in Leipzig on 8 December 1733.

Bach used some of the music a year later for his Christmas Oratorio: including the opening movement with a timpani solo which is used to begin Part I, its closing movement which became the opening of Part III, and two arias.

Tönet, ihr Pauken is counted among Bach's works for celebrations of the Leipzig University, Festmusiken zu Leipziger Universitätsfeiern.

=== Publication ===
Tönet, ihr Pauken! was published in 1887 as part of the first complete edition of the composer's works, by the Bach Gesellschaft. The Christmas Oratorio had already appeared in the same series in 1856. The cantata was published as part of the Neue Bach-Ausgabe in 1962, edited by Werner Neumann.

== Music ==
=== Scoring and structure ===
The cantata is structured in nine movements, with choral outer movements and alternating recitatives and arias as inner movements. The work features four vocal soloists who represent allegorical figures: Bellona (soprano), Pallas (alto), Irene (tenor), and Fama (bass). It is further scored for four-part choir (SATB) and a Baroque instrumental ensemble of three trumpets (Tr), timpani, two flutes (Ft), two oboes (Ob), oboe d'amore (Oa), two violins (Vl), viola (Va) and basso continuo.

In the following table, the scoring follows the Neue Bach-Ausgabe (New Bach Edition). The keys and time signatures are from Alfred Dürr, and use the symbol for common time. The continuo, played throughout, is not shown. The timpani always play with the trumpets.

Movements of Tönet, ihr Pauken! Erschallet, Trompeten!
| No. | Title | Text | Type | Vocal | Brass | Winds | Strings | Key | Time |
|---|---|---|---|---|---|---|---|---|---|
| 1 | Tönet, ihr Pauken! Erschallet, Trompeten! | anon. | Chorus | SATB | 3Tr | 2Ob | 2Vl Va | D major | 3/4 |
| 2 | Heut ist der Tag | anon. | Recitative | T | | | | | common time |
| 3 | Blast die wohlgegriffnen Flöten | anon. | Aria | S | | 2Ft | | A major | 3/4 |
| 4 | Mein knallendes Metall | anon. | Recitative | S | | | | | common time |
| 5 | Fromme Musen! meine Glieder! | anon. | Aria | A | | Oa | | B minor | 3/8 |
| 6 | Unsre Königin im Lande | anon. | Recitative | A | | | 2Vl Va | | common time |
| 7 | Kron und Preis gekrönter Damen | anon. | Aria | B | Tr | | 2Vl Va | D major | 2/4 |
| 8 | So dringe in das weite Erdenrund | anon. | Recitative | B | | 2Ft 2Ob | | | common time |
| 9 | Blühet, ihr Linden in Sachsen, wie Zedern | anon. | Chorus | SATB | 3Tr | 2Ob | 2Vl Va | D major | 3/4 |

=== Movements ===
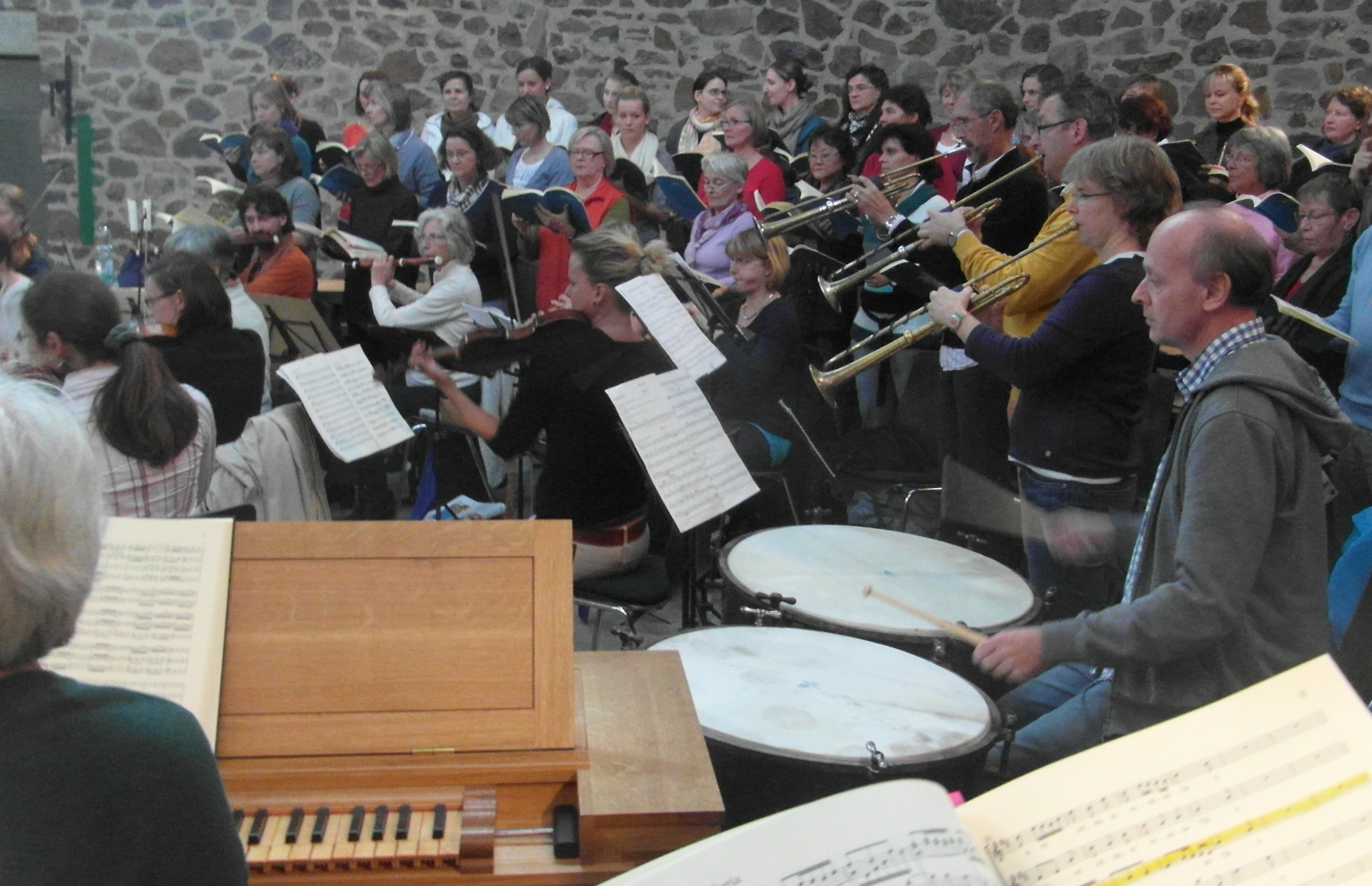
Baroque orchestra with timpani (kettledrums) and trumpets

==== 1 ====
The opening chorus, "Tönet, ihr Pauken! Erschallet, Trompeten!" (Sound, you drums! Ring forth, trumpets!), is a complex long da capo form (ABA). Unusually for Bach, it opens with a timpani solo. It is followed by the trumpets, and then by the strings and woodwinds. The extended instrumental ritornello presents the musical material of the whole movement. The voices enter in unison, first imitating timpani, then trumpets. In the following section, the vocal lines are mostly homophonic and sometimes imitative, while the instrumental forces drive the movement. The second section is a modified repeat of the first. The middle section (B) of the movement also has two elements, an imitative passage in B minor accompanied only by the strings, and a mostly homophonic part with strings and woodwinds, after which A is repeated completely.

Musicologist Julian Mincham notes that "the sweeping exhilaration of this movement is impossible to describe in words". Bach reused the movement as the opening movement of his Christmas Oratorio, "Jauchzet, frohlocket" (Shout for joy, exult). The voices imitate the sound of timpani and trumpets even with the new text.

==== 2 ====
Irene is the first to address the dedicatee. The tenor recitative, "Heut ist der Tag, wo jeder sich erfreuen mag" (This is the day, when everyone can be happy), conveys imagery.

==== 3 ====
Bellona sings an aria, "Blast die wohlgegriffnen Flöten" (Blow the well-handled flutes). Matching the text, the soprano is accompanied by two obbligato flutes. The aria is in three parts, with the third part similar to the first but on different text.

==== 4 ====
The soprano recitative, "Mein knallendes Metall" (My clashing metal), represents the "clashing of arms" and the battlefield, related to the goddess of war.

==== 5 ====
Pallas refers to the muses in an alto aria, Fromme Musen! meine Glieder! (Virtuous Muses! My followers!). It is the only movement in a minor key, accompanied by an obbligato oboe d'amore.

Bach reused the music, transposed for a tenor, in Und es waren Hirten in derselben Gegend, Part II of his Christmas Oratorio, as the aria "Frohe Hirten, eilt, ach eilet", with an obbligato flute, No. 15, in which the shepherds are called to rush to the manger.

==== 6 ====
The alto recitative, "Unsre Königin im Lande" (Our Queen of the land!), is accompanied by strings playing chords.

==== 7 ====
Fama is the last character to appear, singing in a bass da capo aria, "Kron und Preis gekrönter Damen" (Crown and trophy of royal ladies). The voice is complemented by a majestic obbligato trumpet line that underlines the "triumph, dignity and splendor" of the queen. The text focuses on the dual themes of fame and virtue. In this aria, the queen is addressed directly for the first time, "Königin! Mit deinem Namen füll ich diesen Kreis der Welt" (Queen! With your name I flood the entire world). The fanfares of the trumpet are used to illustrate her royal appearance.

In his Christmas Oratorio, Bach used the music in the aria "Großer Herr und starker König" (No. 8).

==== 8 ====
The bass recitative, "So dringe in das weite Erdenrund" (Thus throughout the whole round earth), is accompanied by woodwinds.

==== 9 ====
The cantata is closed with the chorus "Blühet, ihr Linden in Sachsen, wie Zedern" (Bloom, you Saxon lindens, like cedars), a dance-like chorus. Three voices enter successively with parts of the text, first the tenor, the only voice without an aria, then the soprano followed by the alto. All voices repeat the text in homophony, with the first theme in the alto. After an interlude, the process is repeated for the other half of the text.

Bach reused the music of this movement in his Christmas Oratorio to frame Part III, "Herrscher des Himmels" (No. 36).

== Performances and recordings ==
The cantata was performed at the BBC Proms in 1997 by the Amsterdam Baroque Orchestra & Choir conducted by Ton Koopman. In contrast, the complete Christmas Oratorio was given in the same concert series in 1972 conducted by Paul Steinitz, and one aria had been performed as early as 1908.

Recordings have been made by several ensembles, including:

- Kantorei Barmen-Gemarke, Helmut Kahlhöfer, J. S. Bach: Cantatas BWV 207a & BWV 214, Cantate 1961
- Amsterdam Baroque Orchestra & Choir, Ton Koopman. J. S. Bach: Complete Cantatas Vol. 4. Antoine Marchand, 1996
- Collegium Vocale Gent, Philippe Herreweghe, J. S. Bach: Tönet, ihr Pauken! – Cantates profanes, Harmonia Mundi 2004
- Bach Collegium Japan, Masaaki Suzuki. J. S Bach: Secular Cantatas Vol. 5, BIS 2014
- J. S. Bach-Stiftung, Rudolf Lutz, J. S. Bach: Kantate BWV 214 "Tönet, ihr Pauken, erschallet, Trompeten", 2015
