= Wolfgang Kläsener =

- Born: 1962 (age 62–63); Dortmund, Germany
- Education: Folkwang-Hochschule
- Occupations: Church musician; Choral conductor; Academic
- Organizations: Kettwiger Bach-Ensemble; Kantorei Barmen-Gemarke
- Awards: Internationaler Johann-Sebastian-Bach-Wettbewerb

Wolfgang Kläsener (born 1962) is a German church musician, choral conductor, and academic lecturer. He conducted the choir Kantorei Barmen-Gemarke and he is artistic director of the Kettwiger Bach-Ensemble.

== Career ==
Born in Dortmund, Kläsener studied organ with Gisbert Schneider from 1979 and Catholic church music at the Folkwang-Hochschule from 1981, graduating in 1987. As an organist, he was recipient of the third prize at the Internationaler Johann-Sebastian-Bach-Wettbewerb in Leipzig in 1988, and of the Walter Gieseking Competition in Saarbrücken in 1989. He took a concert exam with Daniel Roth in 1990.

Kläsener founded in 1984 the Kettwiger Bach-Ensemble, a chamber ensemble which received several prizes at international competitions. Besides a cappella music from all periods, they try unconventional programming. In October 2017, they performed a program for the Year of the Reformation which combined the last premiere of a work by Thomas Beimel, im anfang war das wort, with Bach's Lutherische Messe in G major and Bruckner's Mass in E minor. The composer had intended the work, based on the prologue of the Book of John, to be performed by the ensemble for his 50th birthday. He had collaborated in rehearsals, but suddenly died. The concert was held in his memory.

From 1985, Kläsener was lecturer of organ and choral conducting at the Bischöfliche Kirchenmusikschule in Essen, and from 1990 lecturer of choral conducting at the Kirchenmusikschule in Rottenburg am Neckar. From 1993, he was artistic director of the Kantorei Barmen-Gemarke. He prepared the Kantorei for performances of Bach's St Matthew Passion in a danced version in 2017, celebrating the 40th anniversary of the relationship between Wuppertal and Beer-Sheva, Israel. The music was shortened and in different order, to match the retrospect narrative of the choreographer Tamir Ginz of the dance company Kamea. The production was shown in Leverkusen, in the Opernhaus Wuppertal, and in Beer-Sheva.

Kläsener conducted the Kantorei Barmen-Gemarke to July 2017, and took up a new position as the church musician in Solingen's West from 9 September 2017. He has run from 2005 a series at the Essen Philharmonie, "Essener Chöre stellen sich vor" (Essen choirs introduce themselves).
