= Eldar Elgrably =

Israeli dancer and choreographer

- Born: October 13, 1986; Rehovot, Israel
- Died: May 23, 2020 (aged 33); Beer Sheba, Israel
- Citizenship: Israel

Eldar Elgrably (Hebrew: אלדר אלגרבלי) was an Israeli dancer and choreographer.

== Biography ==
Eldar Elgrably was born in Rehovot. He studied for 6 years in the dance department of the “Katzir” High School in Rehovot under Marjolein Gotesman. After graduation, Elgrably joined the IDF, where he served as an officer for about 5 years. He went back to dancing after completing the professional dance course in "Bikurey Haetim" dance school in Tel Aviv in 2011.

Eldar Elgrably joined Kamea Dance Company as a dancer in September 2011. He danced major roles in Tamir Ginz’s works till July 2018. Ginz described Eldar as his muse. For several years, prior to leaving Kamea, Elgrably was Company Dance captain. He danced solo roles in the following Kamea productions: "Matthäus-Passion 2727", "Carmina Burana", "Mnemosyne"

Elgrably left Kameat in 2018 and pursued a career as an independent dancer. He performed on several projects with different dance companies. At the same time, Elgrably worked with Kamea as a guest rehearsal director.

Eldar Elgrably returned to Kamea in August 2019 as Assistant to the Artistic Director Tamir Ginz and principal dancer. He was also teaching contemporary dance at the "Bat Dor" School of Dance in Beer Sheva. Elgrably was openly gay.

=== Death ===
Elgraby was found dead in his apartment in Beer Sheba on 23 of May 2020.
