= Aldar =

Aldar may refer to:

- Aldar Properties, a real estate development, management and investment company with headquarters in Abu Dhabi, United Arab Emirates
- Aldar Tsydenzhapov, a conscript seaman of the destroyer Bystry of the Russian Pacific Fleet who was the only fatal victim of a fire that broke out on the destroyer on 28 September 2010
- Akiva Aldar (born 1945), Israeli author and columnist

== See also ==
- Aldar Headquarters building, first circular building of its kind in the Middle East, located in Al Raha, Abu Dhabi, UAE
- Dar (disambiguation)
- Eldar (disambiguation)
- Aldara (disambiguation)
