= Tamir Ginz =

Israeli dancer

- תמיר גינז
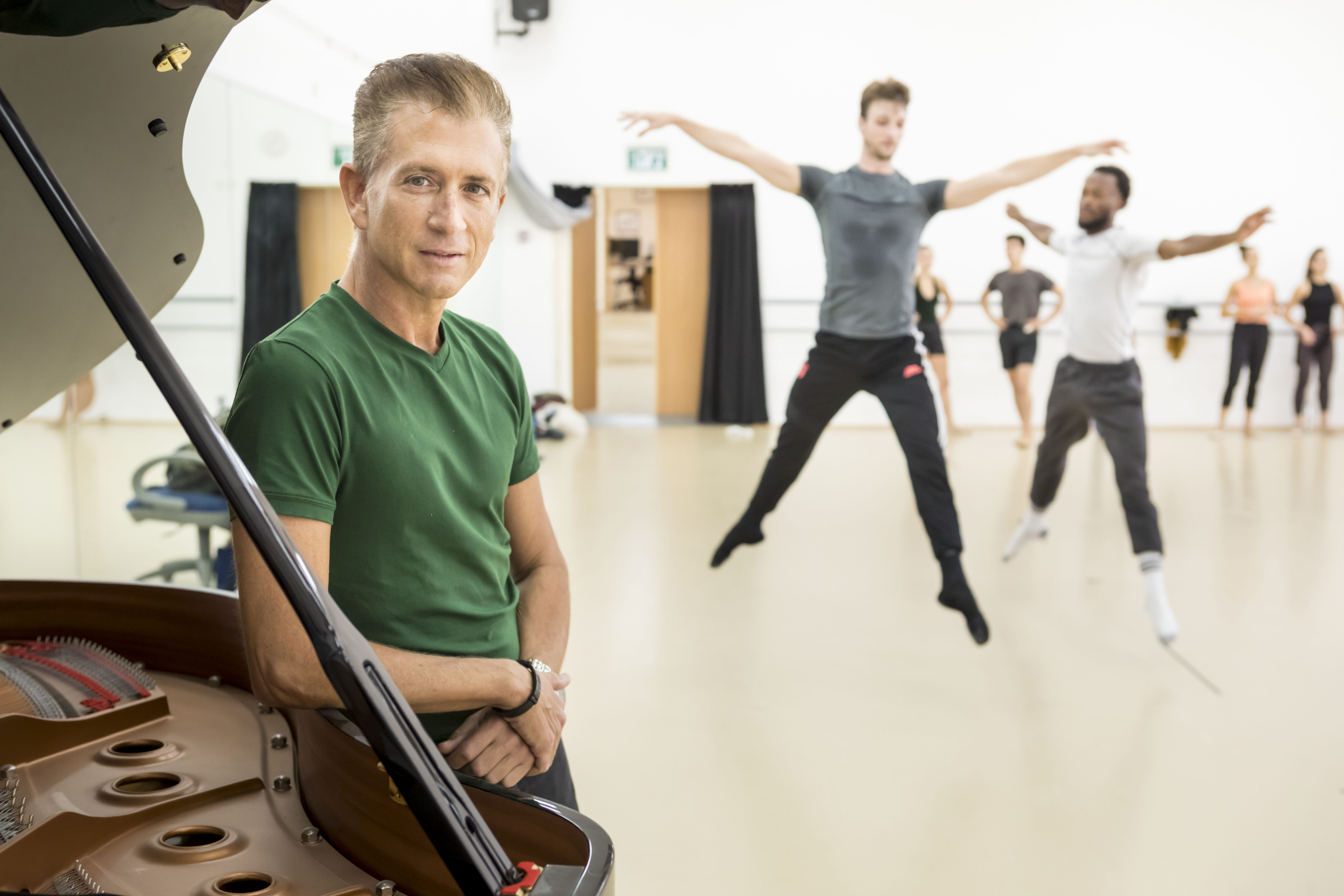
- Education: Haifa University
- Occupation: Modern dance choreographer
- Website: http://kameadance.com/TamirGinz.aspx?lang=2

Tamir Ginz (Hebrew: תמיר גינז) is an Israeli performer of modern dance, choreographer and dance teacher.

== Biography ==
Tamir Ginz started to dance at the age of 13 with his sister Tali Hershkowitz as a teacher in a dance studio in Kiryat Motzkin. Ginz studied dance in Kibbutzim College of Education and London Contemporary Dance School. He received BA in English Linguistics and Literature and Sociology in Haifa University. Tamir Ginz started to perform with the Haifa Ballet. He continued to dance in the Batsheva Dance Company in 1991-1992 at the time when Ohad Naharin became a company's director.

Ginz started choreography career with Bat-Dor Dance Company in Tel Aviv. He created programme 'Platform 1' for Bat-Dor, winning the Danish 1997 Albert Gaubier award for choreography for it. Ginz left Bat-Dor in 2002 and established Kamea Dance Company together with Daniella Shapira. He was appointed Artistic Director of the Company as well as main choreographer. In addition to choreography, Ginz danced in “Secret Garden” and “Limelight” productions.

== Choreographer ==
Ginz works as choreographer include Carmina Burana for the music by Carl Orff, St Matthew Passion (Matthäus-Passion 2727) by Bach in collaboration with the Kantorei Barmen-Gemarke, conducted by Wolfgang Kläsener, and the Wuppertaler Bühnen, and Neverland. A recent creation is Galili and Ginz in collaboration with renowned Israeli Dutch choreographer Itzik Galili.

== Teaching ==
He was main contemporary dance teacher in the Bat-Dor studios of Dance from 1991 till 2002. Ginz was the founder and director of the dance department at the “Blich High School” in Ramat-Gan from 1997 till 2013. From September 2014 till 2017 he was a member of dancing department in Telma Yalin National School for The Arts.

== Awards ==
- 1997 Albert Gaubier award for choreography. For Platform 1.
- 2014 Outstanding "Zionist" creativity in Arts, in the field of dance. Ministry of Culture, Israel.
