= Jerusalem, du hochgebaute Stadt =

German Christian hymn

- Lutheran hymn
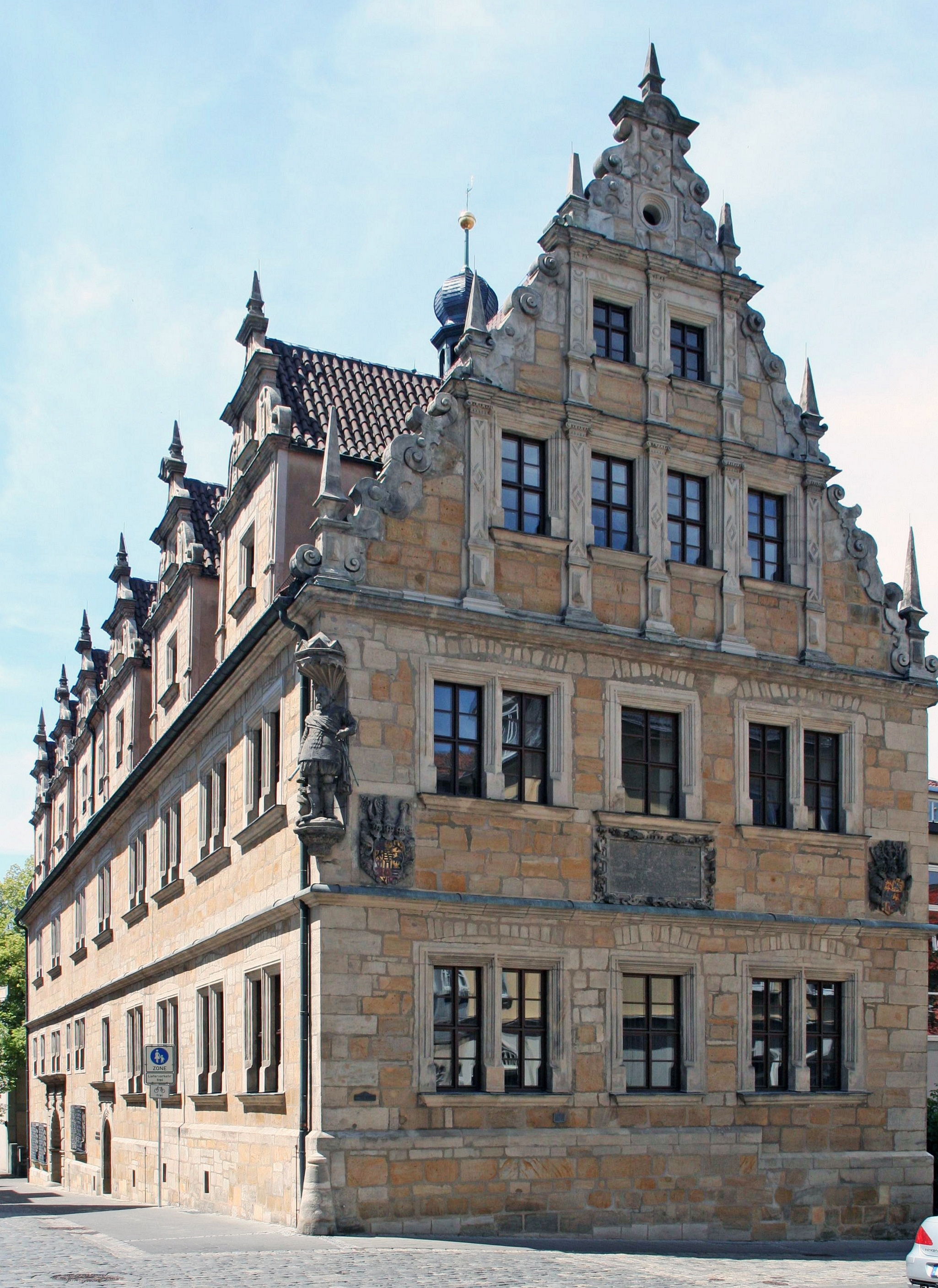
- Casimirianum in Coburg, where the hymn was created
- English: Jerusalem, you city built up high
- Text: by Johann Matthäus Meyfart
- Language: German
- Melody: by Melchior Franck?
- Published: 1626
- MIDI rendition

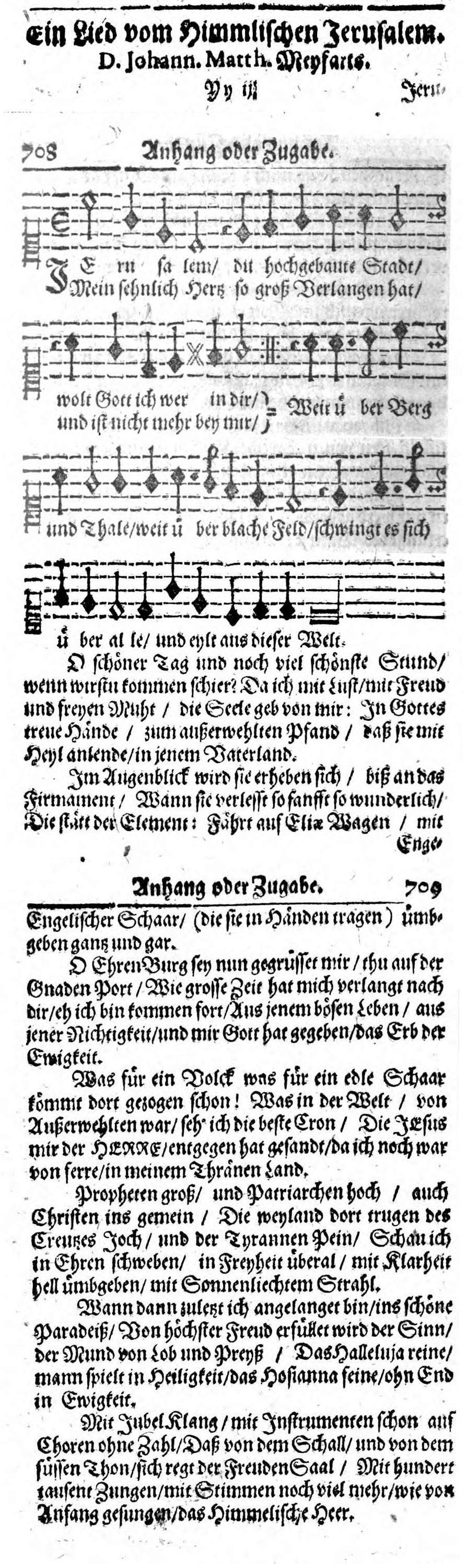
Facsimile of the Erfurter Gesangbuch 1663

"Jerusalem, du hochgebaute Stadt" is a German Christian hymn with lyrics written by the Lutheran Johann Matthäus Meyfart in 1626, and a melody possibly by Melchior Franck. Its theme is the New Jerusalem as the ultimate destination of the Soul, as the subtitle says "Ein Lied vom Himmlischen Jerusalem" (A song of the Heavenly Jerusalem). Originally in eight stanzas, it appears in seven stanzas in the Protestant hymnal Evangelisches Gesangbuch as EG 150), and in five stanzas in the Catholic Gotteslob as GL 553. It was of only regional importance during the Baroque period, but was rediscovered, often printed and set to music from the 19th century.

== History ==
Johann Matthäus Meyfart was a Lutheran minister and professor of theology. He served as Rektor of the Casimirianum in Coburg when he wrote the text. The town was threatened by the Thirty Years' War, and Meyfart wanted to intensify spiritual life and morals of his students. He held regular academic sermons on Wednesdays, until 1625 in Latin, then in German. In the fall of 1626, he held four sermons titled Tuba Novissima (The last trumpet), dealing with "Tod, Gericht, ewige Seligkeit und Verdammnis" (Death, judgement, eternal bliss and condemnation), which were later printed. The Jerusalem song closed his third sermon, titled Von der Frewde und Herrligkeit / welche alle Außerwehlte in dem ewigen Leben zu gewarten haben (Of the joy and glory which the selected ones may expect in eternal life). The printed version contains comments and a final prayer, that were probably also spoken in the event. The printed version also has comments for text changes in three stanzas when the hymn is sung by a congregation.

The song was of only regional importance during the 17th and 18th century. In the 19th century, it was rediscovered, possibly because of its motif of Sehnsucht (yearning / longing / desire) which matched an attitude of the Romantic period. From then on, it has been regarded as one of the most important Protestant songs about dying and eternal life, printed in many song books and hymnals.

The hymn appeared in the Protestant hymnal of 1950, Evangelisches Kirchengesangbuch in the section "Tod und Ewigkeit" (Death and eternity) as EKG 320. Originally in eight stanzas, it appears in seven stanzas in the current Protestant hymnal Evangelisches Gesangbuch as EG 150, in the section "Ende des Kirchenjahres" (End of the church year), marked as ecumenical. Five stanzas were included in the Catholic hymnal Gotteslob in 2013.

=== Theme ===
The imagery of the poetry is based on biblical references to a New Jerusalem, such as Revelation (Revelation 21), the Gospel of Luke (Luke 23:46) and the Book of Kings (2 Kings 2:11). In religious desire and inspiration, Meyfart develops a vision of an ascension of the Soul and the bliss of the transcendent City of God. The hymn is regarded as his best poetry.

== Melody and settings ==
The melody has been regarded as one of the most beautiful chorale melodies ("gilt für einen der schönsten deutschen Choräle"), as an 1893 hymnal printed in Philadelphia says. Its beginning, moving down an octave on triadic notes, is unique.

The melody was first printed, in an earlier version and without naming a composer, in an Erfurt hymnal in 1663. Faksimile Erfurter Gesangbuch 1663 Melchior Franck is most often named as the author. Johann Dilliger (1625–1632), the Kantor of the Casimirianum, could also be the composer.

While the hymn was rarely set to vocal and instrumental music during the Baroque era, it gained in popularity among composers of the Romantic era, namely the Late Romantic period. Georg Schumann composed a chorale motet. Max Reger wrote an organ setting as No. 18 of his 52 chorale preludes, Op. 67 at the beginning of the 20th century. Sigfrid Karg-Elert included the hymn in his as No. 48 of his 1909 66 Chorale improvisations for organ in the section "Reformation, Day of Penance, Communion". Johann Nepomuk David set the tune for organ as Introduktion und Fuge in his first book of chorale settings in the 1930s. Rudolf Mauersberger used the hymn as part of his Dresdner Requiem, written after World War II.

== Translation ==
Catherine Winkworth translated the hymn in 1858 as "Jerusalem, Thou City Fair and High".
