= Protestant Church Ihmert =

Coordinates: 51°20′08″N 7°43′52″E

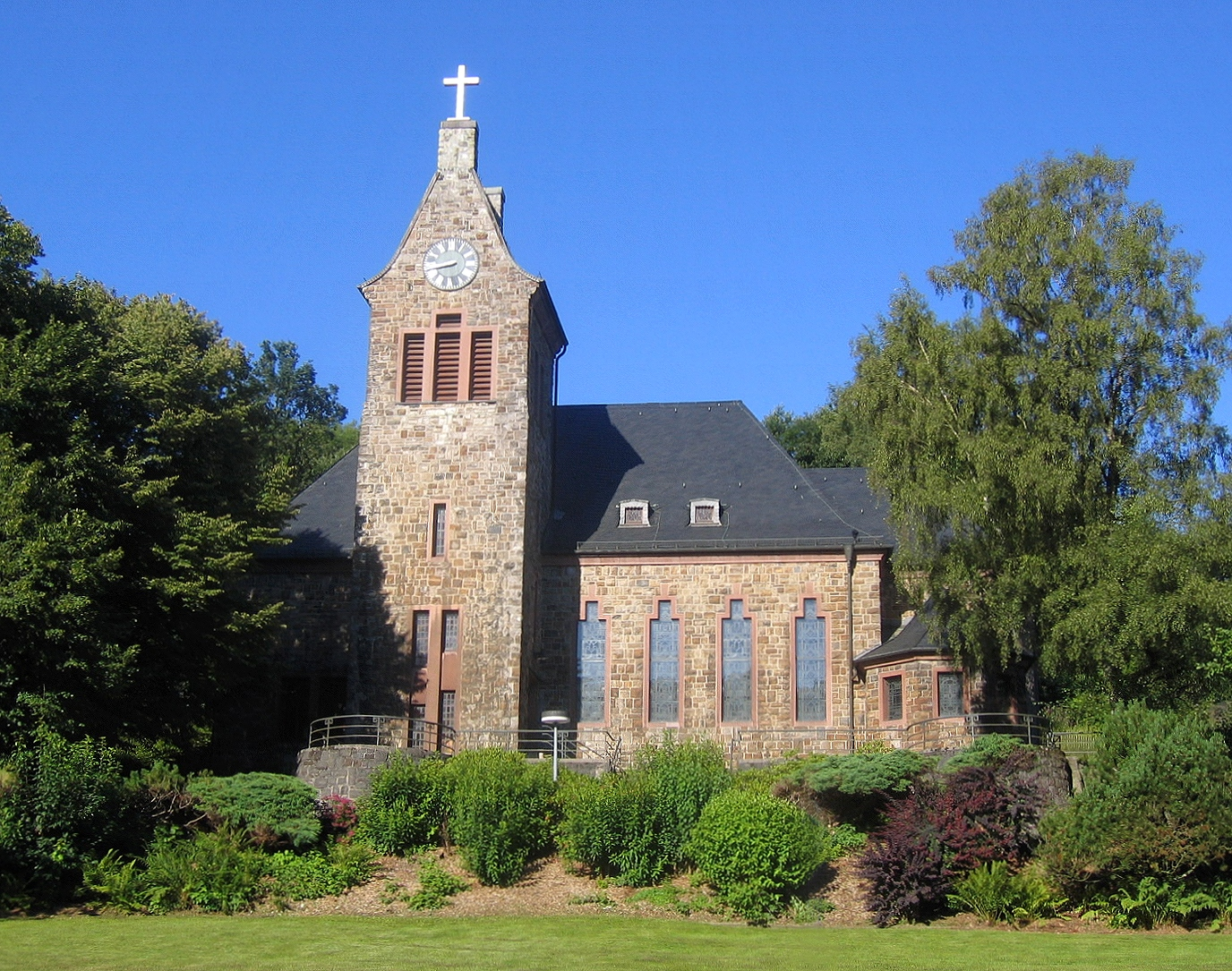
Church in Ihmert

The Protestant Church Ihmert (Ihmerter Kirche) is the only church building in Ihmert, North Rhine-Westphalia, and belongs to the Protestant parish Ihmert–Bredenbruch. Located in the Ortsteil Im Hasberg, it was consecrated in 1931.

The church was built in economically difficult times from 1929 and 1931 and was consecrated on 15 March 1931. The church is built from dimension stone. The interior is dominated by a depiction of the Ascension in the choir. The building was damaged by fire in 1988. It was restored by the architecture firm of Hermann-Josef Geismann.

The first pipe organ was built in 1949. It was damaged by fire in 1988, and was damaged so badly that it could not be repaired. A new organ was built by Hans Peter Mebold (Siegen). The expert who reviewed it when completed on 1 February 1990 described as "Orgelwerk (...), das im westfälischen Orgelbau eine führende Position einnehmen dürfte" (an organ which is expected to take a leading position in Westphalian organ building).

== Literature ==
- Colbey Bevil: Die Fibel. Band 6: Kirchen, Glocken, Orgeln im Stadtgebiet Hemer. Zimmermann-Verlag, Balve 2001. ISBN 3-89053-086-9
