= Protestant Church Wilnsdorf =

Protestant Church
- Evangelische Kirche
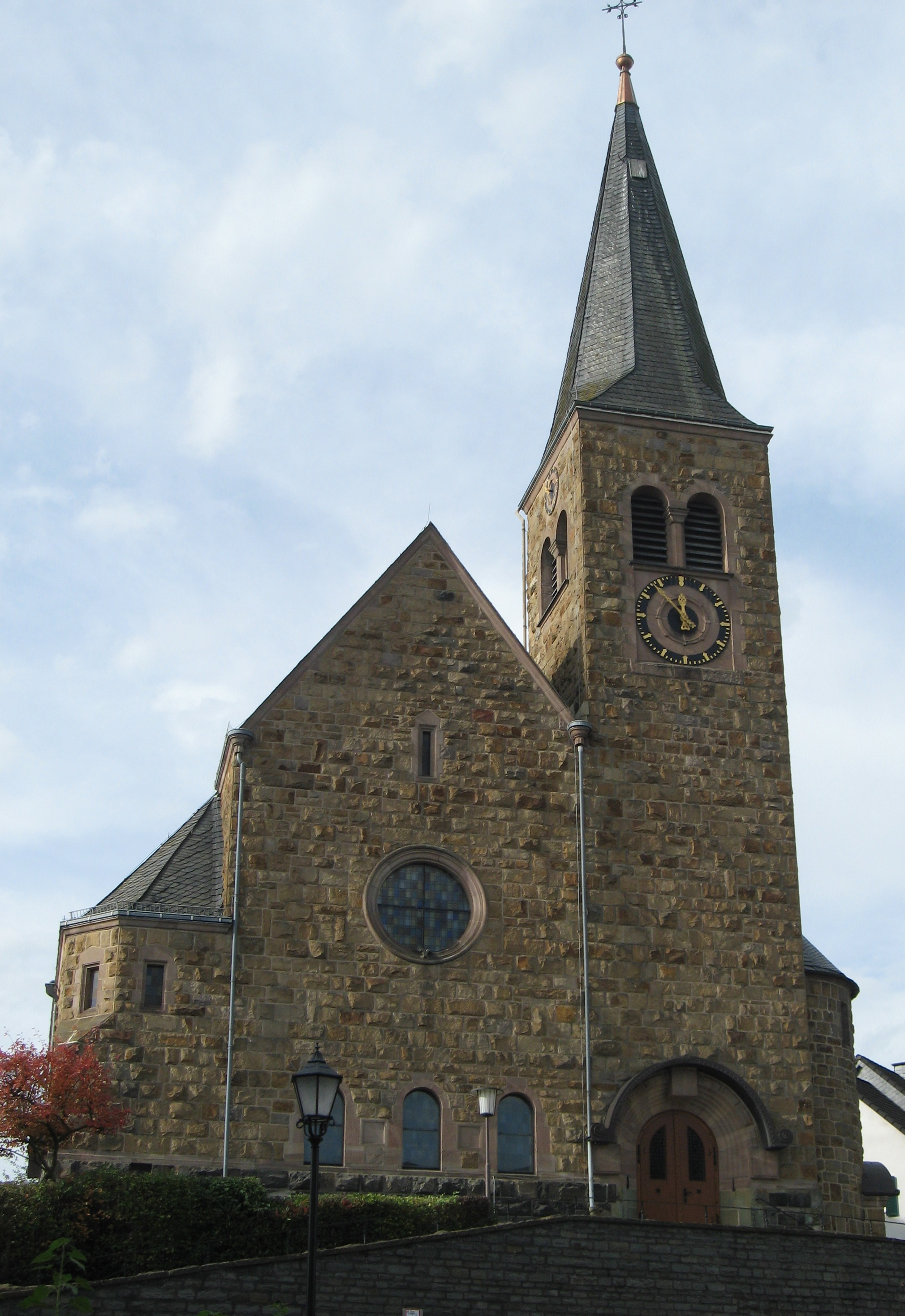
- The church in 2010

- 50°48′57″N 8°06′10″E
- Location: Wilnsdorf, North Rhine-Westphalia
- Country: Germany
- Denomination: Reformed
- Website: www.evkg-roewi.de

Architecture
- Architect: Gustav Mucke
- Style: Jugendstil
- Years built: 1911–1913

The Protestant Church (Evangelische Kirche) in Wilnsdorf, North Rhine-Westphalia, Germany, was completed in 1913. It has been the main church for merged parishes from 2010. The official name of the new parish is Evangelisch-Reformierte Kirchengemeinde Rödgen-Wilnsdorf (Reformed parish), The parish is part of the Kirchenkreis Siegen in North Rhine Westphalia.

The church was built because the older church of 1791 became too small when three parishes were merged in 1892. After a period of plans and rejections beginning in 1904, it was built on a design by Gustav Mucke from 1911. The church in Jugendstil was consecrated on 20 April 1913, seating 540 people. It is built in Jugendstil of bossage stones (Bossenquadermauerwerk), with a steeple integrated at one side of the facade. The architect took the placement of organ, pulpit and altar from the older building. The first organ was built by Paul Faust from Barmen, with two manuals and twelve stops, partly using material from the organ in the former church. It was placed above altar and pulpit.

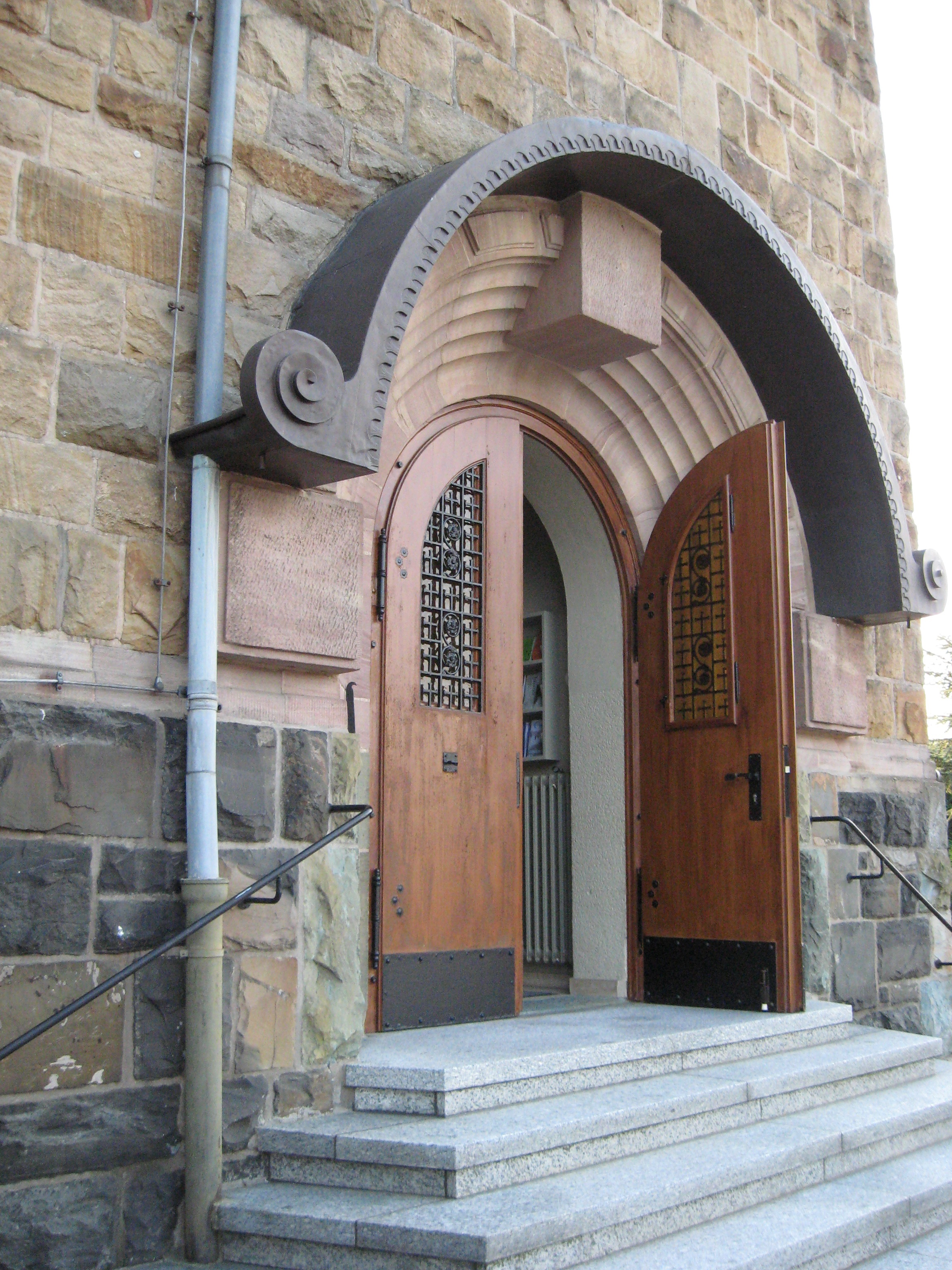
Entrance to the church

The church became a listed historic monument in 1977, as a characteristic building in Jugendstil of the period. In 1988, a new organ by Orgelbau Mebold was installed, with 22 stops. In 2011, the parish was merged with Rödgen in 2011. The centenary of the church was celebrated in 2013, beginning the service with the same song, "Tut mir auf die schöne Pforte" (Open the beautiful gate for me), and using the same text for the sermon as in the service for the consecration, which is also shown in big letters in the altar area: "Herr, ich hab lieb die Stätte deines Hauses und den Ort, da deine Ehre wohnt." (Psalm 26:8)

== Literature ==
- 1913–2003. 90 Jahre Evangelische Kirche Wilnsdorf. Kleine Geschichte der Wilnsdorfer Kirche. Wilnsdorf 2003.
- Franz Dango: Wilnsdorf. Geschichte und Landschaft. Verlag Vorländer, Siegen 1955.
