= Johann Matthäus Meyfart =

German theologian and writer

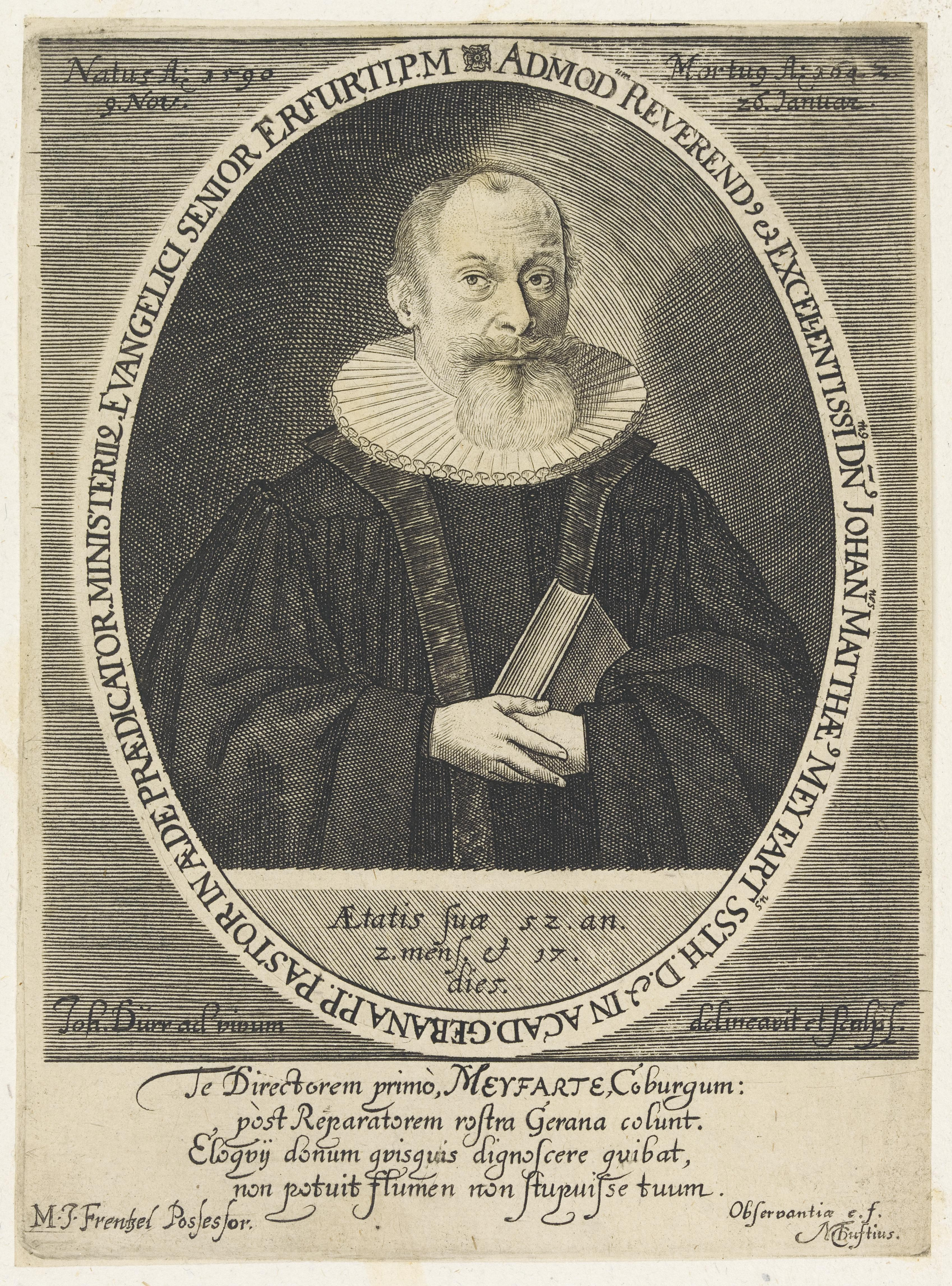
Johann Matthäus Meyfart

Johann Matthäus Meyfart, also Johann Matthaeus Meyfahrt, Mayfart (9 November 1590 – 26 January 1642) was a German Lutheran theologist, educator, academic teacher, hymn writer and minister. He was an opponent fighter of witch trials.

== Career ==
Meyfart was born in Jena, the son of a minister, and studied at the University of Jena from 1608, first the liberal arts graduating in 1603, then theology, continued at the University of Wittenberg from 1614. He taught from 1617 at the Gymnasium in Coburg, serving as its Rektor from 1623.

In 1633 Meyfart was appointed professor of theology at the University of Erfurt. He was the Rektor of the university from 1634 to 1636. During the last years of his life he served as a minister at the Predigerkirche, where he is buried.

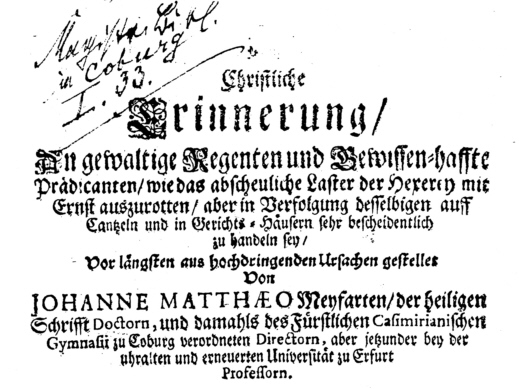
Johann Matthäus Meyfart Schrift 1635

Meyfart is known as the author of hymns such as "Jerusalem, du hochgebaute Stadt" (Evangelisches Gesangbuch EG. 150), written in 1626. He wrote from 1629 to 1632 Christliche Erinnerung, An Gewaltige Regenten und Gewissenhafte Praedicanten, wie das abschewliche Laster der Hexerey mit Ernst auszurotten, aber in Verfolgung desselbigen auff Cantzeln und in Gerichtshaeusern sehr bescheidentlich zu handeln sey., a call against witch trials, published in 1635.

== Selected works ==
- Christliche Erinnerung...wie das abschewliche Laster der Hexerey mit Ernst ausszurotten. Erfurt 1635.
- Teutsche Rhetorica oder Redekunst. ed. Erich Trunz, Tübingen 1977. (Deutsche Neudrucke, Reihe Barock 25; new edition)
- Tuba novissima, das ist, von den vier letzten Dingen. ed. Erich Trunz, Tübingen 1979. (Deutsche Neudrucke, Reihe Barock 26, first Coburg 1626)
- Tuba poenitentiae prophetica, Das ist Das dritte Capitel des Bußpropheten Jonae in fünff unterschiedlichen Predigten. Coburg 1626.
- De disciplina ecclesiastica. 1633.
- Christliche Erinnerungen von der auß den Evangelischen Hohen Schulen in Teutschland ... entwichenen Ordnungen und Erbaren Sitten bey diesen elenden Zeiten eingeschleppten Barbareyen. Schleusingen 1636.
- Mellificium oratorium. three volumes, Leipzig 1628, 1633, 1637.

== Recognition ==
- His day in the Evangelischer Namenkalender (Lutheran Calendar of Saints) is 26 January.

== Literature ==
- C. Hallier: Johann Matthäus Meyfart, ein Schriftsteller, Pädagoge und Theologe des 17. Jhs. ed. Erich Trunz. Neumünster 1982. (Kieler Studien 15)
- Traudl Kleefeld: Johann Matthäus Meyfart: Gegner der Hexenprozesse. In Hartmut Hegeler: Unterrichtsmaterialien Hexenverfolgungen. Unna 2005, p. 68f
- Erich Trunz: Johann Matthäus Meyfart, Theologe und Schriftsteller in der Zeit des Dreissigjährigen Krieges. Munich 1987
- Gerhard Dünnhaupt: Johann Matthäus Meyfart (1590–1642). In: Personalbibliographien zu den Drucken des Barock. Band 4, Hiersemann, Stuttgart 1991, ISBN 3-7772-9122-6. S. 2721–2750.
- Walther Killy (ed.): Literaturlexikon. Autoren und Werke deutscher Sprache. (15 vol). Bertelsmann-Lexikon-Verlag, Gütersloh/München 1988–1991. (CD-ROM: Berlin 1998, ISBN 3-932544-13-7)
- Carl Bertheau (1885). "Meyfart, Johann Matthäus" . Allgemeine Deutsche Biographie (in German). Vol. 21. Leipzig: Duncker & Humblot. pp. 646–648.
- Erich Trunz (1994). "Meyfart, Johann Matthäus". Neue Deutsche Biographie (in German). Vol. 17. Berlin: Duncker & Humblot. pp. 398–399. (full text online).
- Karl Dienst (1993). "MEYFART, Johann Matthäus". In Bautz, Traugott (ed.). Biographisch-Bibliographisches Kirchenlexikon (BBKL) (in German). Vol. 5. Herzberg: Bautz. cols. 1429–1431. ISBN 3-88309-043-3.
- "Entry". Zedlers Universallexikon. Vol. 20. p. 761.
