= Corno da tirarsi =

Baroque brass instrument

The corno da tirarsi ("pull horn") is a Baroque brass instrument. Johann Sebastian Bach wrote for the instrument when he was working in Leipzig, and it appears to have been played for him by Gottfried Reiche. It is said to appear in four Bach cantatas, but only in three cantatas is it called for by name. Those are BWV 46, 162 and 67. Outside of the works of Bach, there is no evidence of its existence. Olivier Picon states "No… corno da tirarsi instrument remains. Nor some dictionary article, maker's bill, player's list, picture or document of any kind that would bring proof of the actual existence of the instrument. The reality of the corno da tirarsi is only documented (as far as we know) by its music – and that by a single composer."

Its characteristics are debated, but it was most likely a horn that resembled the "Inventions" horn of the late 18th century: "a freely-moving, double (cylindrical) tuning slide positioned diametrically across its circular body". It also may have been a slide trumpet.
