= Aldara =

Aldara may refer to:

- Former name of Alvanq, a community or municipality in Armenia
- Àldara, Sardinian name of Ardara, Sardinia, a comune or municipality
- Imiquimod or Aldara, a prescription medication that acts as an immune response modifier

== See also ==
- Aldara Park, Gauteng, a suburb of Johannesburg, South Africa
