= Helmut Kahlhöfer =

German church musician and academic teacher

- Born: 25 July 1914; Barmen, German Empire
- Died: 12 April 1988 (aged 73); Wuppertal, Germany
- Education: Musikhochschule Köln; Mozarteum
- Occupations: Church musician; Choral conductor; Academic teacher
- Organizations: Kantorei Barmen-Gemarke; Folkwang-Hochschule
- Awards: von der Heydt-Kulturpreis

Helmut Kahlhöfer (25 July 1914 – 12 April 1988) was a German church musician and academic teacher. He was the founder and for decades the conductor of the choir Kantorei Barmen-Gemarke.

== Life and career ==
Born in Barmen (now part of Wuppertal), Kahlhöfer studied Protestant church music at the Musikhochschule Köln, organ with Heinrich Boell and Michael Schneider, piano with Karl Hermann Pillnay, and choral conducting with Otto Siegl. Kahlhöfer graduated in 1937 with the A-Examen and the concert exam for organ. He worked as a church musician (Kantor) in Cologne from 1937 to the beginning of World War II. He then continued his studies at the Salzburg Mozarteum, conducting with Clemens Krauss and piano with Walter Lampe.

Kahlhöfer worked in Wuppertal from 1945. In 1946 he became Kantor of the Reformed Immanuelskirche in Barmen-Gemarke and founded there in 1946 the choir Kantorei Barmen-Gemarke which he conducted to 1986. He worked also from 1950 to 1960 as a lecturer for organ at the Landeskirchenmusikschule in Düsseldorf, and as a professor for choral conducting at the Folkwang-Hochschule in Essen from 1965 to 1978.

He conducted the Kantorei Barmen-Gemarke to 1986. He led the choir in liturgical music but also concerts of music from the Renaissance to the 20th century. In 1966 he conducted a recording of Johann Sebastian Bach's "Jesu meine Freude" (Motette zu fünf Stimmen BWV 227) and Johannes Brahms's "Fest- und Gedenksprüche" (opus 109, Motette für achtstimmigen Doppelchor) and Warum ist das Licht gegeben dem Mühseligen? (Op. 74, Nr. 1, motet for six-part choir). In 1973 he conducted a recording of Max Reger's three motets Geistliche Gesänge, Op. 110. Fritz Christian Gerhard dedicated in 1965 his cantata Jerusalem to him and the choir: "Für Helmut Kahlhöfer und die Kantorei Barmen-Gemarke“. In 1980 he conducted Paul Hindemith's Apparebit repentina dies, and in 1982 Stravinsky's Mass and Symphony of Psalms. Bach was the focus of the choir's repertory. They recorded Bach's motets in 1963 with the Collegium Aureum, and several of his cantatas including Schauet doch und sehet, ob irgend ein Schmerz sei, BWV 46, in 1960 and Nun komm, der Heiden Heiland, BWV 61, in 1966, with the ensemble Deutsche Bachsolisten. Kahlhöfer conducted Bach's St Matthew Passion, St John Passion and Mass in B minor in the years 1983 to 1985, to celebrate the 300th anniversary of Bach's birth in 1985. The Mass was also recorded that year with soloists Mitsuko Shirai, Hildegard Laurich, Karl Markus and Andreas Schmidt.

Kahlhöfer was awarded the title Kirchenmusikdirektor (director of church music) in 1954. From 1961 to 1986, he also directed the Schönhausen-Chor in Krefeld. Kahlhöfer died in Wuppertal.

== Awards ==
- 1976 – von der Heydt-Kulturpreis of Wuppertal
