= Orgelbau Mebold =

Germany organ building company

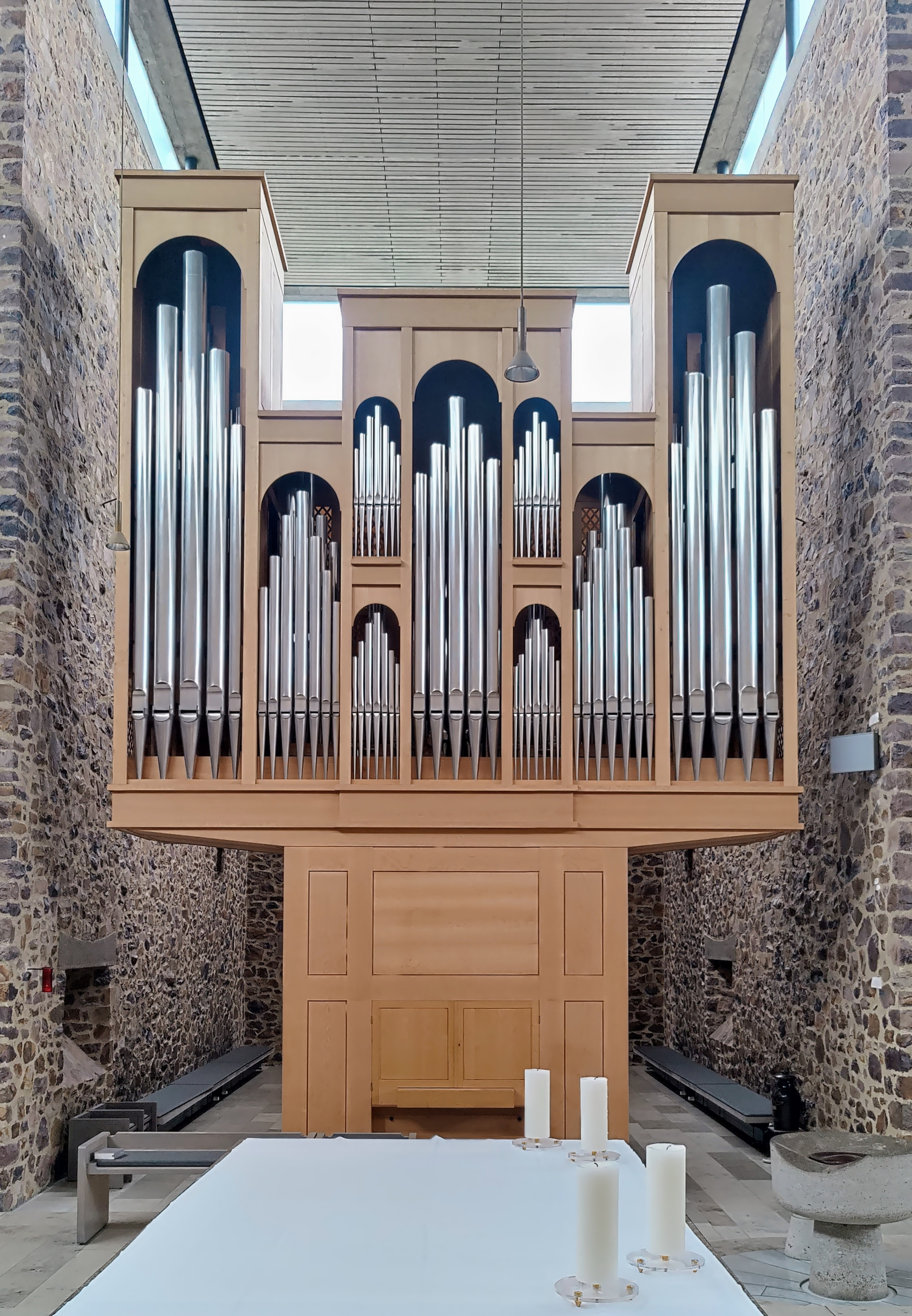
- Mebold Organ in St. Martin, Idstein, 2023
- Founded: 1967; 59 years ago
- Founder: Hans Peter Mebold
- Headquarters: Siegen, North Rhine-Westphalia
- Products: Pipe organs
- Owner: Mathias Mebold
- Website: www.orgelbau-mebold.de

Orgelbau Mebold is a company building pipe organs in Siegen, Germany. It was founded in 1967 by Hans Peter Mebold (27 April 1942 – 21 July 2001), and has been run since 2018 by his son Mathias Mebold (born 1978). The company builds new organs, restores historic instruments, and specializes in portable small instruments (Truhenorgel).

Hans Peter Mebold
- Born: 27 April 1942; Weidenau
- Died: 21 July 2001 (aged 59); Siegen
- Occupation: Organ builder
- Organizations: Orgelbau Mebold

== Founding ==
Hans Peter Mebold was born in Weidenau. He learned organ building with Hans Dentler, and worked in the workshop of Emil Hammer Orgelbau, with Richard Rensch, Günter Hardt, at the Germanisches Nationalmuseum and with Gerald Woehl. He founded the company Orgelbau Mebold in Frauenberg near Marburg in 1976. In 1979, they moved to Siegen, to the village Breitenbach. Hans Peter Mebold died in 2001.

== Continuation ==
After Mebold's death, Johannes Tobias Späth took over, together with Marianne Mebold, the founder's widow. From 1982, he was responsible for the workshop.

As of 2018, the owner is Mathias Mebold, a son of Hans Peter Mebold, born in 1978.

== Organs and concerts ==
The company builds new organs, mostly for use in parish churches, but also in parish halls and hospitals. A typical layout combines a Great division (Hauptwerk) in Baroque style with a Swell division (Schwellwerk) with timbres of the Romantic period, which makes it possible to play a wide range of organ repertory. The company restores historic instruments. It has specialized in building small organs called Truhenorgel, which serve for accompanying choirs in church and for rehearsal.

Mebold organs have attracted notable organists to play concerts. Dan Zerfaß, organist of the Worms Cathedral, played the first concert at the organ in St. Martin, Idstein, in 2006, followed by concerts of Kalevi Kiviniemi, and the duo Giora Feidman and Matthias Eisenberg, among others. Anton Guggemos, the organist of the Wieskirche, played in St. Bardo in Petterweil, part of Karben.

== Works ==
Among the organ builders' new instruments are:

Year	Location	Church / facility	Image	Manuals	Stops	Notes
1970	Hasselbach			II	20	House organ, now in Essen
1982	Fronhausen	Heilig Kreuz		II	8	
1986	Siegen	Catholic-Apostolic Church		III/P	14	
1987	Burgsolms	St. Elisabeth		II/P	16	
1988	Wilnsdorf	Protestant Church Wilnsdorf		II/P	21	
1989	Ihmert	Protestant Church Ihmert		II/P	17	
1991	Dalheim (Wetzlar)	Parish Centre		II/P	18	
1994	Mainz-Hechtsheim	Protestant Parish Centre		II/P	16	
2002	Welschen Ennest	St. Johannes Baptist		II/P	26	
2005/06	Idstein	St. Martin		II/P	33	
2007	Lichenroth	Protestant Church		I	10+1	
2010	Hahnstätten	St. Nikolaus		I	13	New in 1747 case
2010	Petterweil	St. Bardo		II	15	
