= Eldar Quliyev =

Azerbaijani film director (1941–2021)

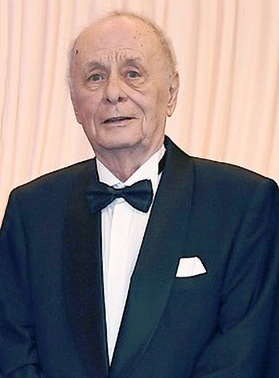
- Quliyev in 2018
- Born: Eldar Tofiq oğlu Quliyev; January 18, 1941; Baku, Azerbaijan SSR, Soviet Union
- Died: April 16, 2021 (aged 80); Baku, Azerbaijan
- Occupations: Film director, screenwriter, actor
- Years active: 1966–2020

Eldar Quliyev (January 18, 1941 – April 16, 2021) was a Soviet and Azerbaijani film director, screenwriter, and actor.

== Biography ==
Eldar was the son of composer and pianist Tofig Guliyev. He studied at the Gerasimov Institute of Cinematography from 1960 to 1966, where he was taught by Sergei Gerasimov. He then began working for the film studio Azerbaijanfilm in 1967, where he directed fictional films and documentaries. He also became a professor of cinematography at the Azerbaijan State University of Culture and Arts. That year, he directed his first short film, titled Biri vardı, biri yoxdu.... His best known films include Babek and Nizami.

Eldar Quliyev died in Baku on 16 April 2021 at the age of 80.

== Filmography ==
- Bir cənub şəhərində (1969)
- Var olun, qızlar... (1972)
- Səmt küləy (1975)
- Ürək... Ürək... (1976)
- Sevinc buxtası (1977)
- Babek (1979)
- Nizami (1982)
- Gümüşgöl əfsanəsi (1985)
- Burulğan (1987)
- Təxribat (1989)
- Dostuma məktub (1992)
- Unudulmuş qəhrəman (2005)
- Girov (2005)
- Heydər Əliyev. Dünyaya pəncərə (2006)
- İstanbul reysi (2010)
- Dərvişin qeydləri (2013)

== Awards ==
- Honored Art Worker of the Azerbaijan SSR (1976)
- State Prize of the Azerbaijan SSR (1978)
- Order of the Red Banner of Labour (1980)
- People's Artiste of the Azerbaijan SSR (1982)
- Shohrat Order (2001)
- Sharaf Order (2011)
- Honorary Diploma of President (2016)
- “Gizil Chinar” International Award (2018)
- Istiglal Order (2021)
