= Kantorei Barmen-Gemarke =

- Choir
- Origin: Wuppertal
- Founded: 1946 by Helmut Kahlhöfer
- Genre: Mixed choir
- Chief conductor: Volker Hempfling
- Website: www.kantorei-barmen-gemarke.de

The Kantorei Barmen-Gemarke (Barmen-Gemarke chorale) is a mixed concert choir based in Wuppertal, Germany, focused on sacred music. It was founded by Helmut Kahlhöfer in 1946 and conducted by him for more than four decades. Their repertory includes great classical works as well as premieres of contemporary music. The choir has appeared internationally.

== History ==
The choir was founded in 1946 by Helmut Kahlhöfer as the church choir of the Protestant reformed parish of the same name. Kahlhöfer was interested early in a small well-trained flexible group which could perform not only Baroque music but also earlier compositions from the 16th and 17th century. In 1957, the broadcaster Westdeutscher Rundfunk began a partnership with the choir which resulted in 123 recordings, from a single chorale to a contemporary oratorio by Ingo Schmitt, a dean of the Musikhochschule. The choir performed motets by Praetorius, Schütz, Bach, Mendelssohn, Brahms, Reger, Pepping and Dallapiccola, among others. Kahlhöfer conducted the choir for more than four decades to 1987, when he was succeeded by Manfred Schreier. Wolfgang Kläsener was the conductor from 1993 to 2017, succeeded by Volker Hempfling. All conductors pursued rich stylistic diversity. From 2004 the choir used a new Truhenorgel by Orgelbau Mebold.

They recorded cantatas and passions by Johann Sebastian Bach, both with Kahlhöfer as with Kläsener. In 2001 they recorded Max Bruch's Schön Ellen, a choral ballad for two solo singers, chorus and orchestra, with the Wuppertal Symphony Orchestra conducted by George Hanson. Reviewer Christopher Fifield noted that they do justice to Bruch's early style, especially at the "jubilant end". In 2012 they were invited to concerts in Israel with the Sinfonietta Beer Sheva, to celebrate the orchestra's 40th anniversary. In 2015 they participated in an event at the Stadthalle Wuppertal with flautist Ian Anderson, John O'Hara and the Wuppertaler Sinfonieorchester.
