= Kamea (dance company) =

Kamea Dance Company
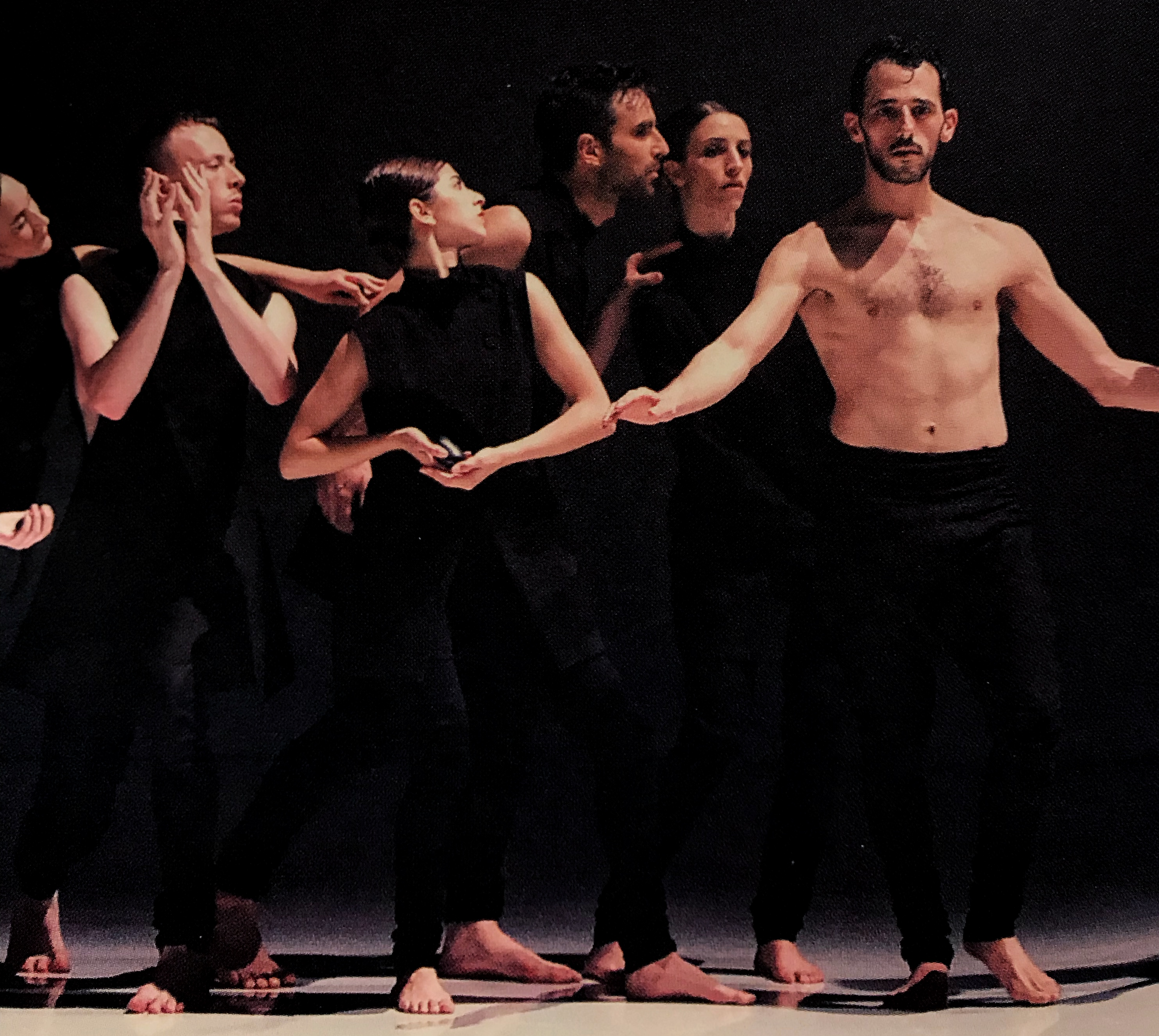
- St Matthew Passion by Kamea Dance Company

General information
- Name: Kamea Dance Company
- Year founded: 2002
- Founders: Daniella Schapira, Tamir Ginz
- Location: Beer Sheva
- Principal venue: The Cebrin Goodman Home for the Kamea Dance Company
- Website: http://kameadance.com/Index.aspx?lang=2

Senior staff
- Director: Merav Zimand

Artistic staff
- Artistic director: Tamir Ginz

Other
- Official school: School of Alberta Ballet

Kamea Dance Company is a dance company based in Beer Sheva, Israel.

== History ==
Kamea dance company was established in Beer Sheva in 2002 by Daniella Schapira and Tamir Ginz. The company is affiliated with Beer-Sheva Municipal Dance Center. The company performs works by Ginz and by guest choreographers. Company regularly performs in Suzanne Dellal Center for Dance and Theater in Tel Aviv. Kamea dance company worked with Nacho Duato. In 2017, company created dance version of Johann Sebastian Bach oratorio St Matthew Passion.

== Notable performances ==
- Bamidbar Devarim. Choreography by Tamir Ginz. Premiered in Suzanne Dellal Center for Dance and Theater.
- Gnawa. Choreography by Nacho Duato.
- St Matthew Passion. Choreography by Tamir Ginz. Premiered in Erholungshaus Leverkusen.
