= Paul Cottancin =

French engineer

- Born: January 12, 1865; Reims, France
- Died: 1928
- Occupation: Engineer
- Known for: Reinforced concrete and brick structures

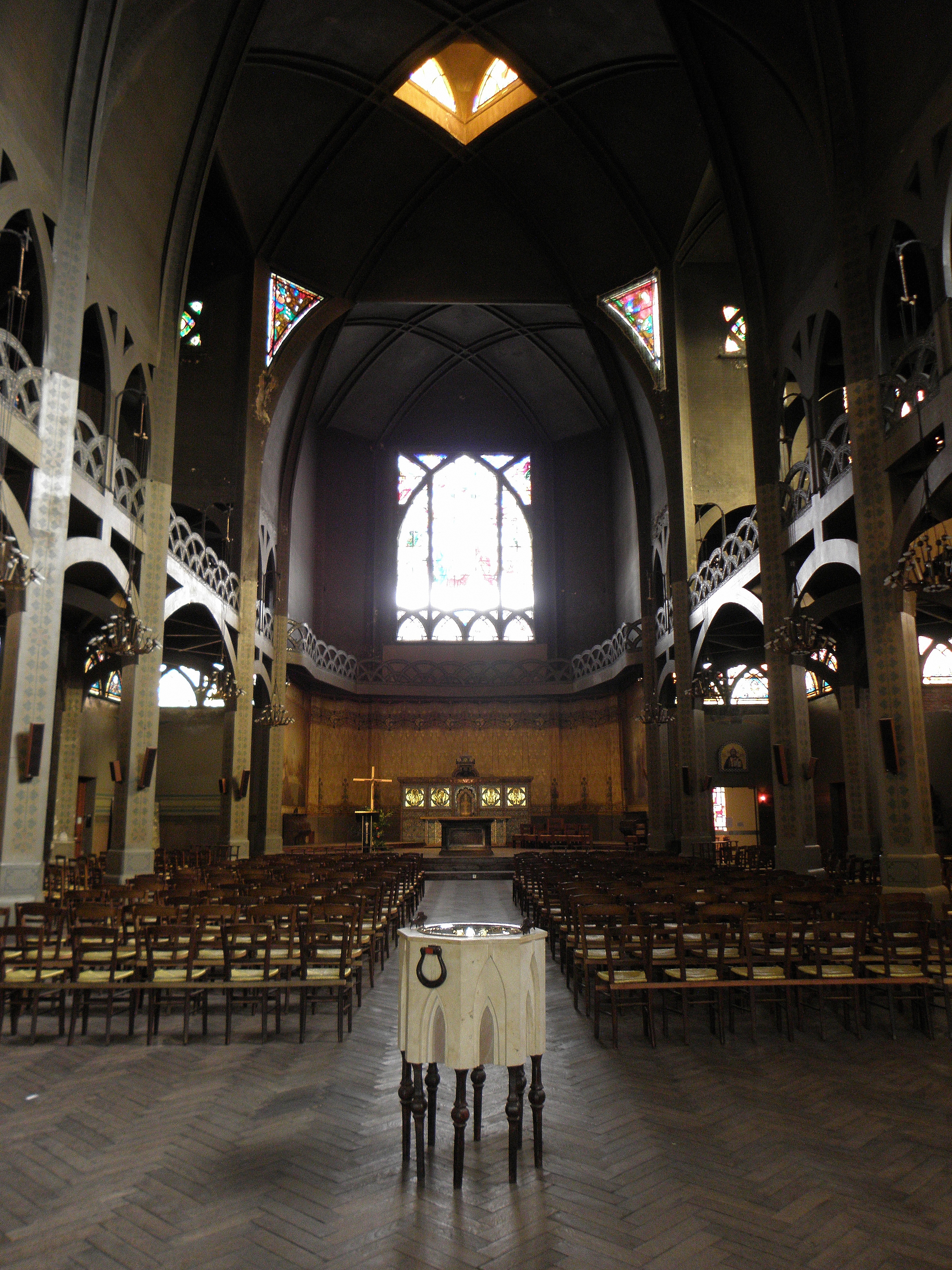
Interior of Saint-Jean-de-Montmartre

Paul Cottancin (12 January 1865 - 1928) was a French engineer and a pioneer in the use of reinforced brickwork and concrete. He is known for the church of Saint-Jean-de-Montmartre in Paris, which he designed in collaboration with the architect Anatole de Baudot.

== Life ==
Paul Cottancin was born in Reims in 1865. He studied engineering at the École centrale des arts et manufactures. He received a diploma from the École Centrale in 1886, and filed his first patent in March 1889 for a type of metal frame for reinforced cement or other reinforced materials. He subsequently moved to England and then to Ireland. He worked as a contractor and a consultant, and also as engineer for his own structures. He filed a series of patents up to 1900 as he refined his reinforced concrete system.

Paul Cottancin died in 1928. He has been seen as having considerably more artistic sensitivity than was common with engineers of his day. He thought of his structures in terms of surfaces and forms.

== Cottancin's system ==
Cottancin did not use heavy bars within thin layers of concrete, but dissipated force by using wire meshes and nets distributed throughout the material. His 1889 patent was for wire mesh embedded in 50 millimetres (2.0 in) concrete slabs, supported by "spinal stiffeners", or triangulated ribs. With his iron or steel trellises he could make plane or curved shapes. The structures that employed his designs typically have plate-like arches and struts. Cottancin also experimented with hollow masonry laced with wires and filled with cement. The bricks have the same compression strength as the cement, while the wires resist extension. Using bricks avoids the need to build and remove forms for the cement.

In contrast to other engineers working in reinforced concrete, Cottancin did not see the material in terms of the actions, tension and compression of the component materials. Instead, he viewed the sheets of reinforced concrete used for the walls and floors of his buildings as a monolithic material in its response to stress. Cottancin's woven mesh may be viewed as a precursor to modern welded sheets of steel fabric. However, Cottancin's system was less practical than the béton armé technique of François Hennebique, perfected in 1897, which became standard practice after Paul Christophe published Le béton armé et ses applications in 1902.

== Work ==
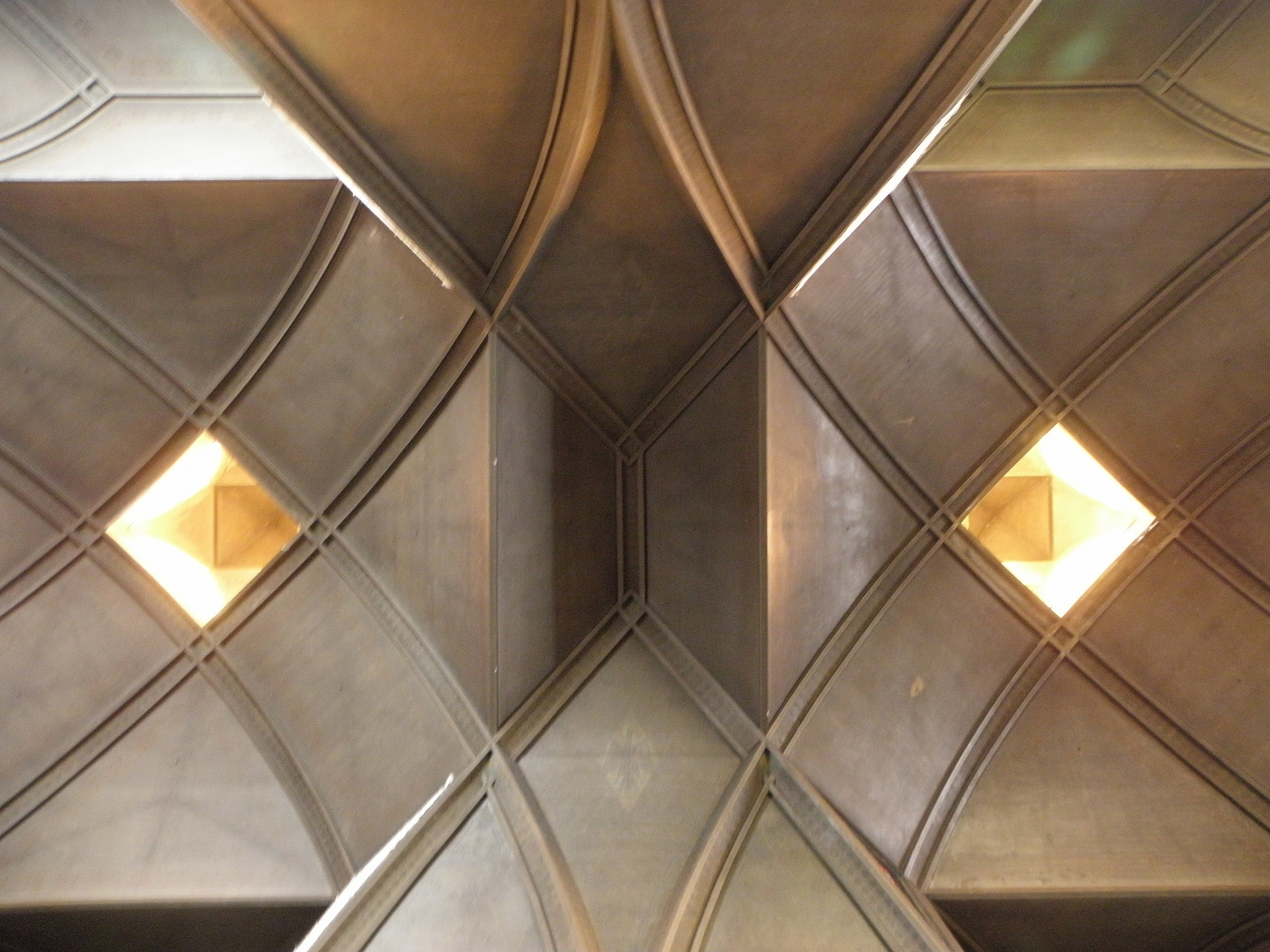
Ceiling vaults of Saint-Jean de Montmartre

=== Saint-Jean de Montmartre ===
Cottancin worked with Anatole de Baudot, a structural-rationalist pupil of Eugène Viollet-le-Duc, in the design of the church of Saint-Jean-de-Montmartre. Building started in 1897, but was suspended in 1899. The immediate reason was an infraction of planning regulations, but doubts were raised about the ability of the reinforced concrete floors and piers to carry the loads. Extensive tests were carried out, subjecting the components to extreme stress, before construction was allowed to resume in 1902, complete in 1904.

The church structure is based on reinforced cement piers and rib vaults, roofed in two layers of reinforced cement separated by a 4 millimetres (0.16 in) layer of slag. The walls consist of two layers of brick separated by a 7 centimetres (2.8 in) air gap. The church is faced on the outside with orange brick. This was the first religious building to be built from reinforced concrete in France.

=== Methodist church, Exeter ===
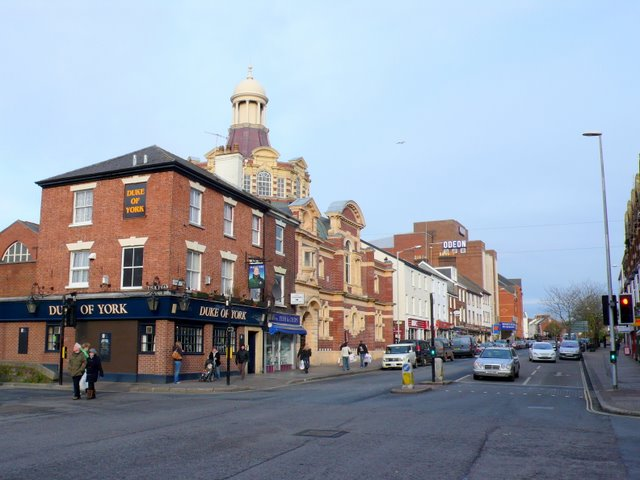
Methodist Church in Sidwell Street, Exeter, England (behind the "Duke of York" pub)

Cottacin designed the Methodist Church in Sidwell Street, Exeter, England, built between 1902 and 1907. As with other buildings, the structure combined reinforced concrete and reinforced brick. The red brick wall is made of two 3 inches (76 mm) brick skins joined across a 20 inches (510 mm) cavity by reinforced diaphragms. Each brick has four perforations. Vertical wires run through these perforations, and are interwoven with horizontal wires that run through each bed joint. Inside, a gallery 13 feet (4.0 m) wide is cantilevered from three walls. The roof has an octagonal dome with 2 inches (51 mm) of reinforced concrete resting on an inner skin of reinforced brickwork. A decorative lantern tower and ventilation turret tops the dome. There are ornate moldings around the doors and windows that look like stone but in fact are reinforced concrete.

=== Other structures ===
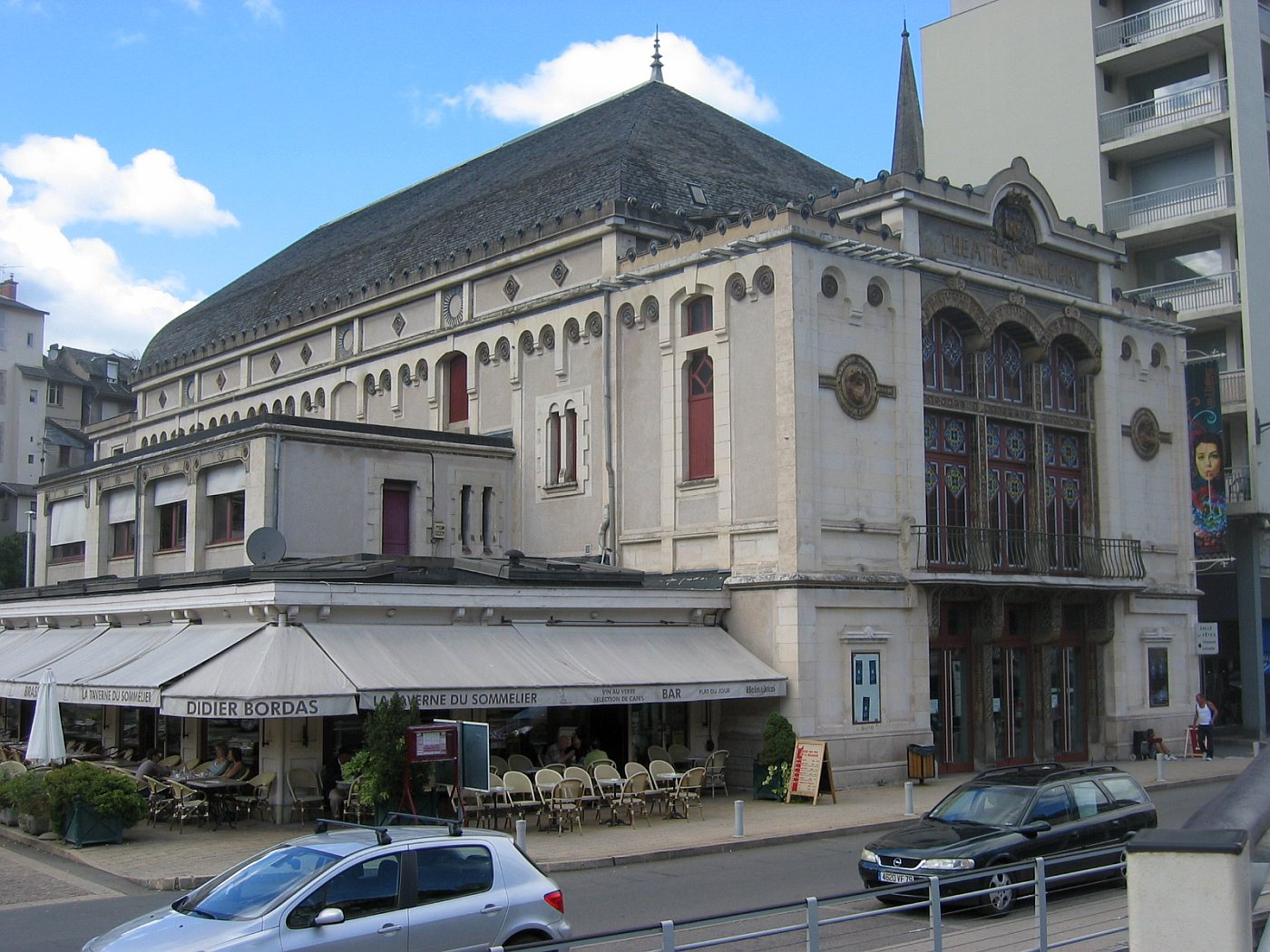
Tulle Theater

Other structures that used his system included:

- Restoration of floors of the castle of Blois in 1893
- House of Paul Cottencin, at the corners of Rue de Lonchamp and Rue Pomereu
- Floor of the shop at 125 rue de Montreuil
- Floors of the Lycée Victor Hugo, rue de Sévigné, Paris
- Festival room of the café Globe
- Floor of the Schweitzer factory, providing an overload of 1,000 kg/m^{2}
- San Merino Pavilion for the Exposition Universelle (1900) in Paris.
- Road bridge in Portugal
- Tulle Theater
- Maison Bigot, 29 avenue Rapp, a fashionable townhouse
- Townhouse of Anatole de Baudot
- La Sadikia in Tunis
- Foundations of Enghein Casino
- Roofs of the château de Rochefort-en-Yvelines
- Reservoir of Montretout
- Reservoir of Deux-Portes, Louveciennes
