= Anatole de Baudot =

French architect (1834–1915)

Joseph-Eugène-Anatole de Baudot
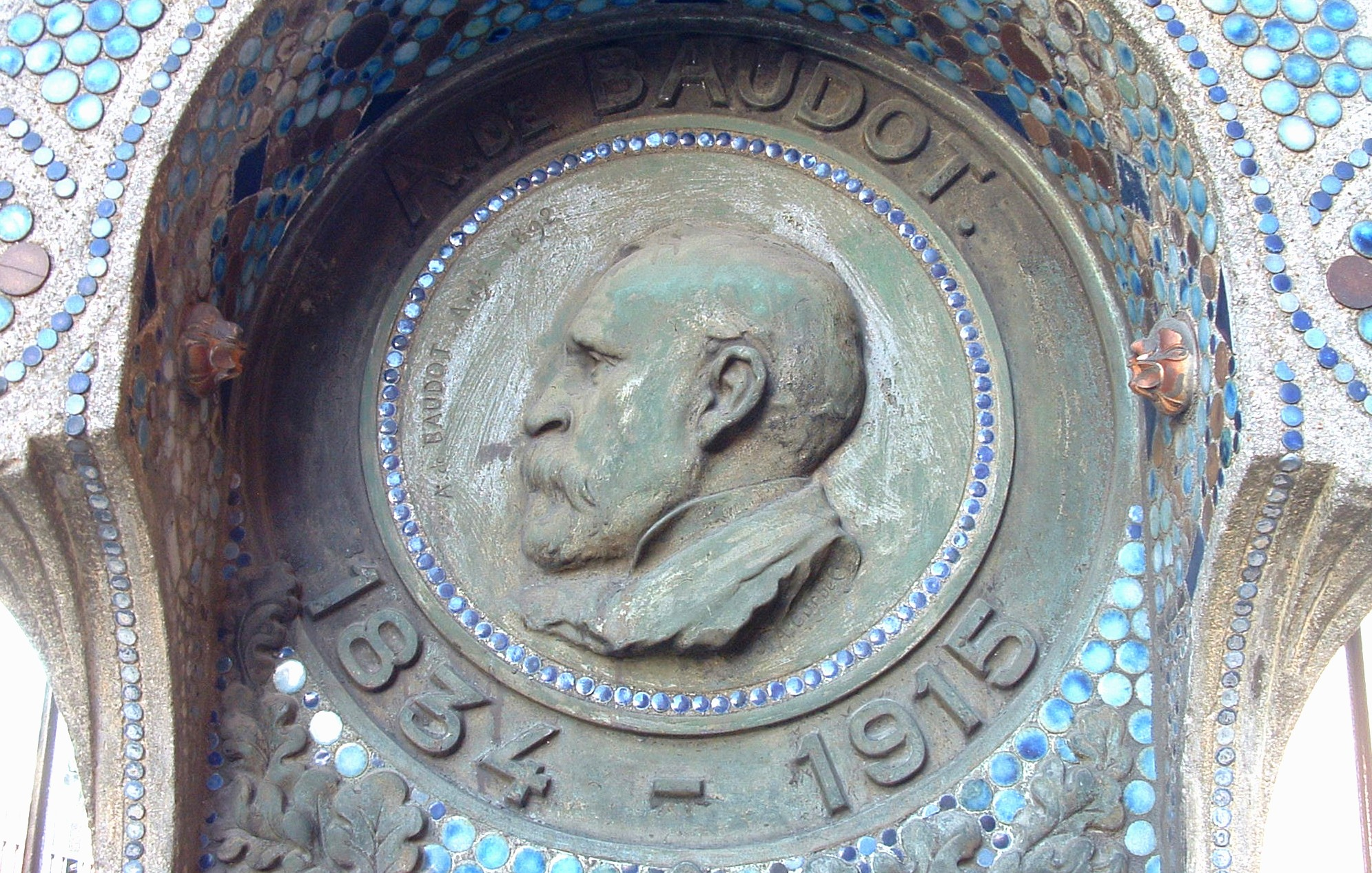
- Commemorative plaque at the Church of Saint-Jean-de-Montmartre.
- Born: 14 October 1834; Sarrebourg, France
- Died: 28 February 1915 (aged 80); Paris, France
- Occupation: Architect

Joseph-Eugène-Anatole de Baudot (French: [anatɔl də bodo]; 14 October 1834 – 28 February 1915) was a French architect and a pioneer of reinforced-concrete construction. He was a prolific author, architect for diocesan buildings, architect for historical monuments, and a professor of architecture. He is known for the church of Saint-Jean-de-Montmartre in Paris, the first to be built using concrete reinforced with steel rods and wire mesh.

== Life ==
Anatole de Baudot was born on 14 October 1834 in Sarrebourg. He attended the École des Beaux-Arts in Paris, where he studied under Henri Labrouste and Eugène Viollet-le-Duc. He won the Grand Prix de Rome.

From 1863, Baudot was involved in the subject of education of architects, related to reform of the Beaux-Arts, writing several articles on the subject. In 1865 he was among the first members of the École Spéciale d'Architecture. Others were Ferdinand de Lesseps, Émile Pereire, Eugène Flachat, Jacques-Charles Dupont de l'Eure, Jean-Baptiste André Godin, Eugène Viollet-le-Duc and Émile Muller.

Anatole de Baudot became a respected writer on architectural subjects for journals such as the Gazette des architectes and the Encyclopédie de l'architecture. He was employed by the government in 1873 as an architect for diocesan buildings. In 1879 he was appointed to the historical monuments committee, eventually becoming inspector-general in 1907. From 1887 to 1914 he was also a professor of History of Art at the Trocadéro. Baudot retired in 1914 and died in Paris on 28 February 1915.

=== Journalist ===
Anatole de Baudot contributed to the Gazette des architectes et du bâtiment (1865–1871). His influence converted the journal into a more serious publication, reducing the number of articles that served as advertising. He was a polemic writer, denouncing the decline of architecture in the 19th century, whose roots he traced to the abandonment of Gothic architecture principles in the 17th and 18th centuries. He also blamed the teaching at the Beaux-Arts.

After November 1888 Baudot was head of the Encyclopédie de l'architecture, and with his collaborators Paul Gout and Henri Chaine devoted the journal to promoting modernist concepts. He would remain in charge until 1892. He introduced photography of archaeological sites and of monuments. A series covered the buildings erected for the Exposition Universelle (1889). In 1890 Baudot also became responsible for publication of the Bulletin de l'Union syndicale des architectes français. This may have served as a distraction from his work on the encyclopedia.

=== Architect ===
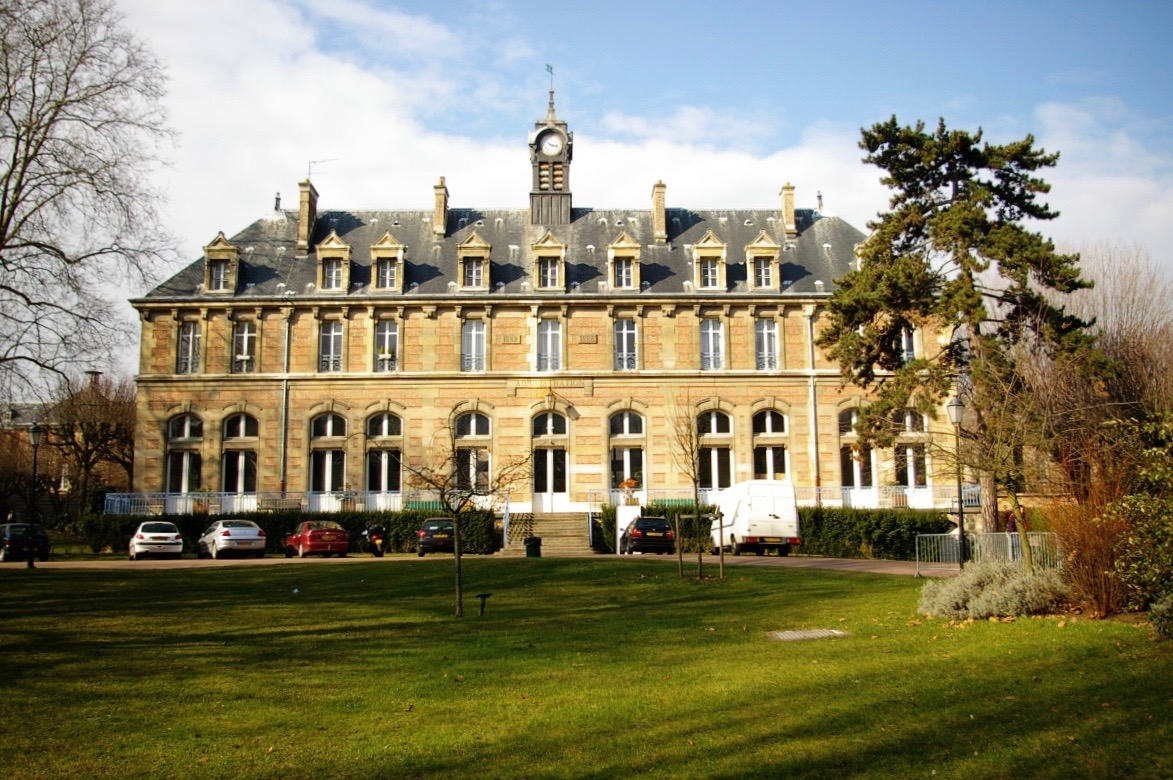
Lycée Lakanal in Sceaux.

Anatole de Baudot took great interest in churches. He noted that the practical problem to be solved was the same in the 19th century as in the 13th century. In an 1866 article in the Gazette he pointed out that the main requirements for church builders were to cover large spaces with few internal supports so that many believers could move easily, and to meet the needs of the religion. In 1869 he published Église du bourgs et de villages, which discussed and compared old and modern forms of churches, arguing the case for constant improvements in architectural design.

The minister for public education and cults designated him architect of diocesan buildings in 1873, and he rose to the position of inspector general of diocesan buildings in 1879. Baudot was made a member of the Committee on Historical Monuments on 27 March 1879. He was appointed vice-president of the Commission of Historical Monuments in 1880. In 1907 he was appointed Inspector General of Historical Monuments.

In 1882 Anatole de Baudot was appointed architect for the new Lycée Lakanal, a boarding school in Sceaux set in the former park of the Duchess of Maine. It included the administration building, classrooms, studies and dormitories, baths, kitchens and dining rooms. He designed the buildings to capture as much light and air as possible. He broke with the tradition in which courtyards were surrounded by buildings. Baudot used a combination of brick, stone and metal, creating a polychrome design. His buildings were modern and functional.

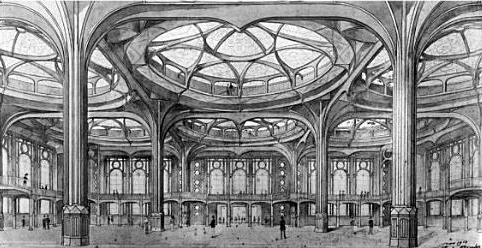
Design for a large covered space (1914) using reinforced concrete pillars and arches.

Baudot was interested in exploring use of new materials as a vehicle for expressing new architectural ideas, and became interested in the potential of reinforced concrete. He adopted the system developed by Paul Cottancin, an engineer from the Ecole centrale des arts et manufactures, based on columns and arches of cement reinforced by iron rods and a wire mesh. He said that this material gave the architect a simplified way to ensure unity of structure.

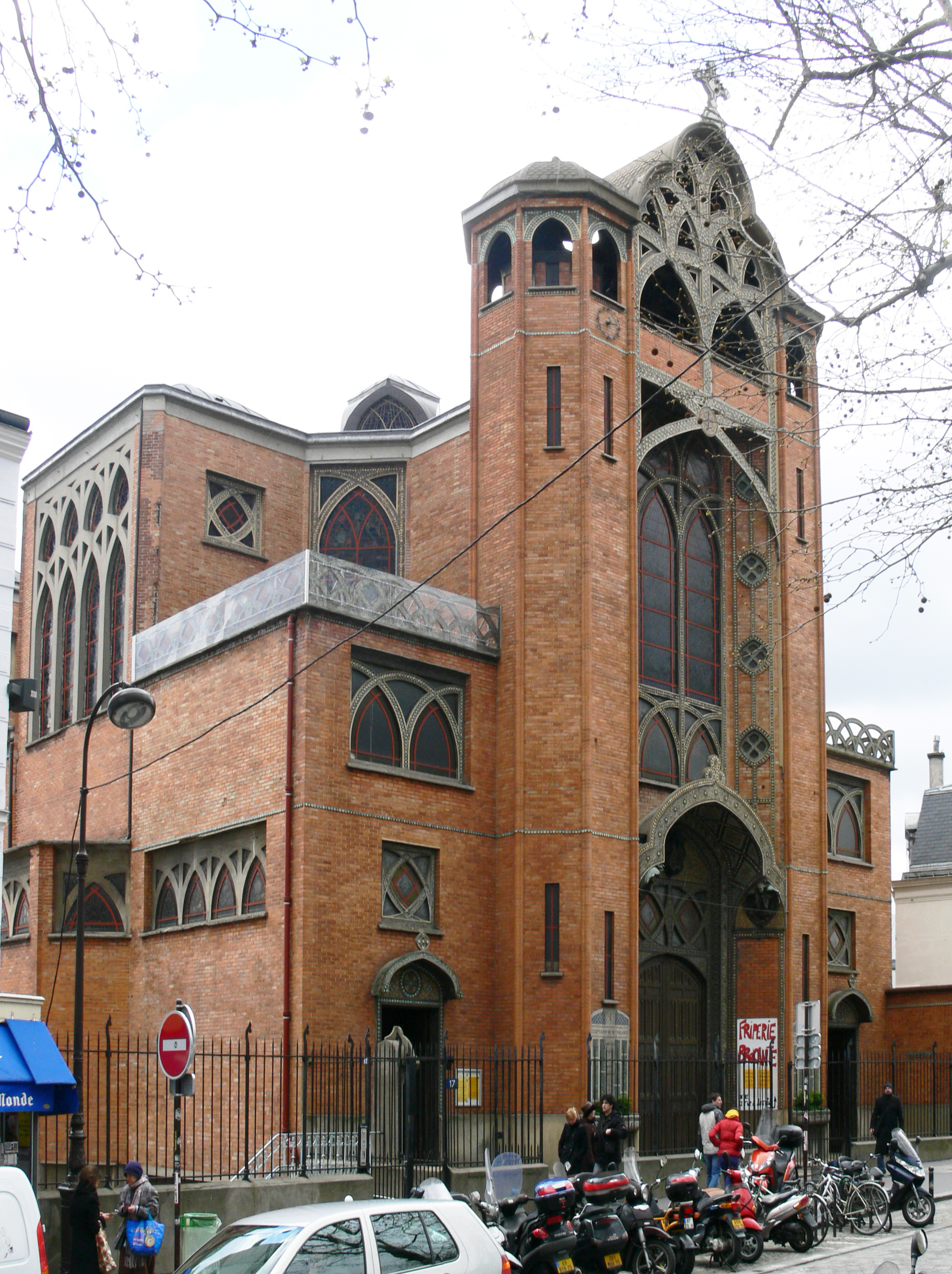
Saint-Jean-de-Montmartre.

Baudot's design for the church of Saint-Jean-de-Montmartre, Paris, whose construction started in 1894, was the first to use a reinforced concrete framework enclosed by thin exterior walls. His Théatre de Tulle was built between 1899 and 1902 on the site formerly occupied by a 17th-century Jesuit chapel. It was one of the first to be built of reinforced cement. The facade was polychrome, incorporating sandstone, limestone, ceramics, colored glass and brick.

=== Professor ===
In 1887 Anatole de Baudot was appointed titular professor of medieval and renaissance architecture at the Beaux-Arts. The same year he was appointed to the chair of History of Art at the Trocadéro, where he became interested in the study of Roman architecture in France. Baudot would remain at the Trocadéro until 1914.

== Views ==
Anatole de Baudot followed Viollet-le-Duc as a proponent of Structural Rationalism. Although a firm believer in progress in architecture, he felt that understanding the great periods of historical architecture were important to addressing modern challenges. He supported the creation of a course on the history of medieval architecture at the Beaux Arts, since this knowledge was essential for architects responsible for restoring buildings from that period. He was against mixing historical styles, making "irrational" use of columns and orders, and using stone in place of modern materials.

Baudot was never able to completely shake off traditional ideas. He saw architectural research as primarily one of technical problems. He was less perceptive of the social needs of the occupants of the buildings. This was apparent in a 1905 plan he submitted for a public housing project with small and inaccessible interior yards, brick walls in reinforced concrete frames.

Baudot was opposed to Art Nouveau. He believed that buildings should be "truthful" in displaying their structure. Decoration was acceptable only where it complemented the structure rather than concealing it. He believed in the importance of architecture appropriate for the needs of the age. Baudot also called for a fresh start in developing contemporary architecture under the influence of engineers. In 1889, the year of the exposition, he said,

A long time ago the influence of the architect declined, and the engineer, l'homme moderne par excellence, is beginning to replace him... It will not be [arbitrarily chosen] shapes which will form the basis of the new architecture: in urban planning, in the real application of modern construction, the taking into account of the new situations which must be reckoned with will lead us to the shapes so long sought in vain. But, you will say, what you propose are the methods of engineering today. I do not deny it, for these are correct.

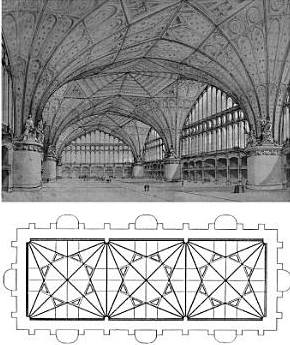
Anatole de Baudot's alternative design for the Galerie des machines, published in 1905.

However, commenting on the Galerie des machines built for the 1889 exposition, Baudot found that the proportions did not work. He was disconcerted by the reversal of proportions from traditional structures: the supports tapered towards the ground, and the steel girders were narrow and light. In 1905 his alternative design was published, enclosing an equal area with supporting pillars and arches that had more conventional proportions. His design required fewer but larger pillars, and combined lateral and longitudinal arches

== Work ==
=== Restorations ===
Anatole de Baudot worked under Eugène Viollet-le-Duc at the Château de Vincennes before taking the lead alone for 40 years. At Toulouse and the castle of Blois he followed Félix Duban.

- Church of Aubazine, Corrèze
- Abbey church of Saint-Pierre de Beaulieu-sur-Dordogne, Corrèze
- College church of Saint-Martin de Brive-la-Gaillarde, Corrèze
- Church of Saint-Pierre d'Uzerche, Corrèze
- Church of Saint-Nicolas-Saint-Laumer in Blois, Loir-et-Cher
- Church of Notre-Dame de Nanteuil in Montrichard, Loir-et-Cher
- Church of Notre-Dame-la-Blanche in Selles-sur-Cher, Loir-et-Cher
- Church of Saint-Amant-de-Boixe, Charente
- Church of Preuilly-sur-Claise, Indre-et-Loire
- West portal of the Clermont-Ferrand Cathedral, Puy-de-Dôme

=== Construction ===
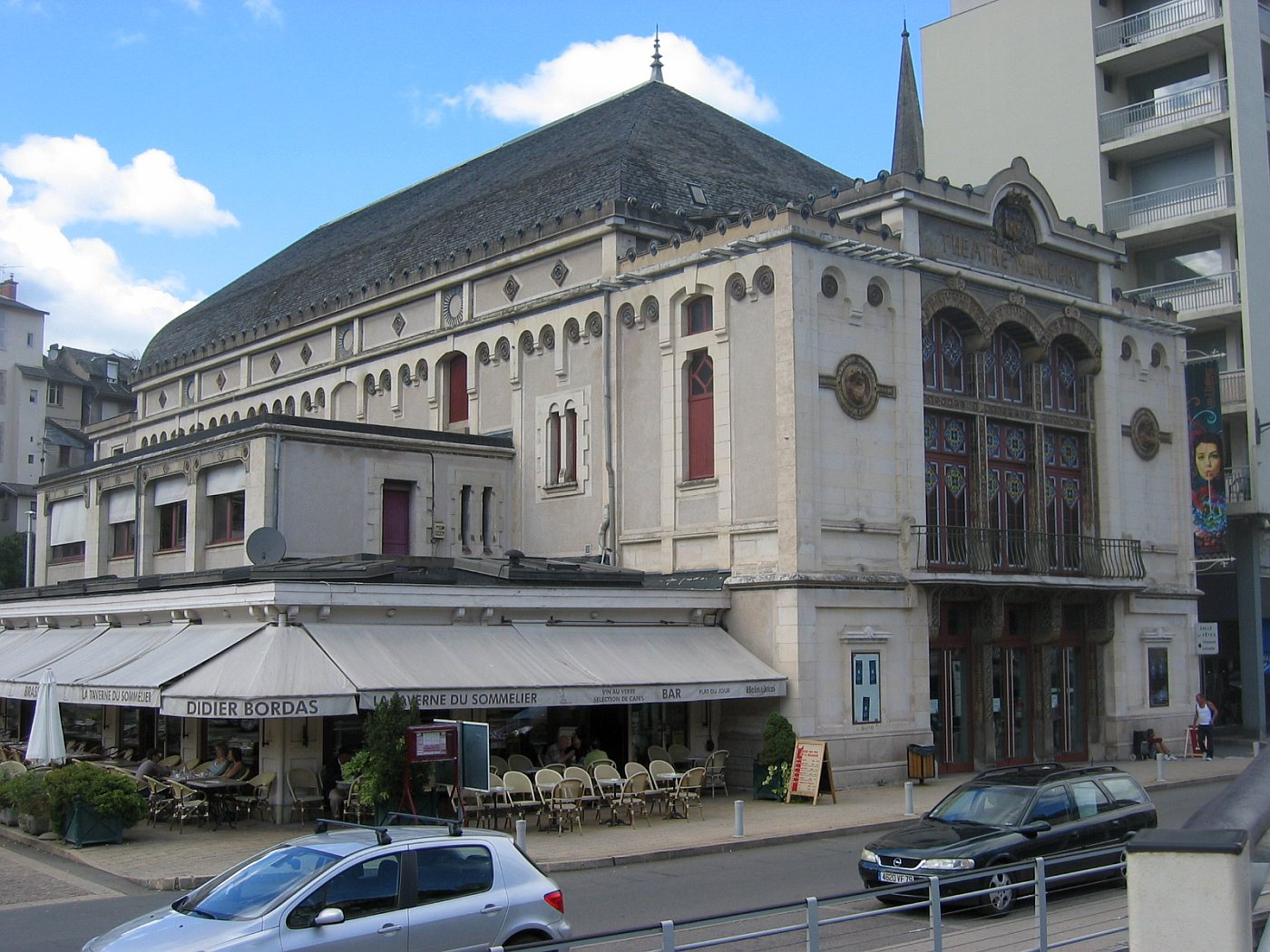
Théâtre de Tulle, designed by Anatole de Baudot.

- 1871: Reconstruction of the church of Saint-Lubin in Rambouillet, replacing a 12th-century church that was considered too old and too small
- 1882: Lycée Lakanal in Sceaux
- 1887: Lycée Edmond-Perrier in Tulle with polychrome facades of brick, ceramics and metal, similar to the Lycée Lakanal
- 1894: Lycée Victor-Hugo in the 3rd arrondissement of Paris
- 1894-1904: Church of Saint-Jean-de-Montmartre in the 18th arrondissement of Paris, using the reinforced concrete system of Paul Cottancin (Note: Cottancin's system consisting of a form of wire mesh where the warp and weft are formed by the same wire. The walls are made of stacked bricks.)
- 1899-1902: Théâtre Les 7 collines (Tulle), using a thin shell of reinforced concrete for the dome roof

=== Publications ===
- Baudot, Anatole de (1867). Églises de bourgs et villages. A. Morel.
- A. de Baudot, ed. (1884). La sculpture française au moyen âge et à la renaissance. Fossez.
- Calliat, Victor; Lance, Adolphe; Baudot, Anatole de; Chaine, Henri; Gout, Paul (1891). Encyclopédie d'architecture et des arts qui s'y rattachent. Librairies imprimeries réunies, Ancienne maison Morel, May et Motteroz.
- Viollet-le-Duc, Eugène Emmanuel; Baudot, Anatole de (1896). Dessins inédits de Viollet-Le-Duc. A. Guérinet.
- 1890-1900: Archives de la Commission des Monuments Historiques.
- Baudot, Anatole de; Perrault-Dabot, A. (1901). Les cathédrales de France. Librairie Renouard, HenriLaurens.
- Anatole de Baudot; A. Perrault-Dabot (1901). Champagne. Lorraine. Bourgogne. Franche-Comté. Nivernais. Orléanais. Touraine. Volume 3 of Archives de la Commission des monuments historiques / Publ. par les soins de MM. A. de Baudot; A. Perrault-Dabot. Assistés d'une délégation de la Commission des monuments hist. Laurens.
- Baudot, Anatole de (1904). L'Architecture et le ciment armé. Office général d'éditions artistiques. p. 47.
- Baudot, Anatole de; Chaine, Henri (1916). L'architecture: Le passé.--Le présent. H. Laurens.
- Van Pelt, John Vredenburgh; Anatole de Baudot; France. Commission des monuments historiques. Archives (1924). Selected monuments of French gothic architecture: one hundred plates from the Archives de la Commission de monuments historiques. The Pencil Points Press, inc.
