= Saint-Jean de Montmartre =

Church of Saint-Jean de Montmartre
- Église Saint-Jean de Montmartre
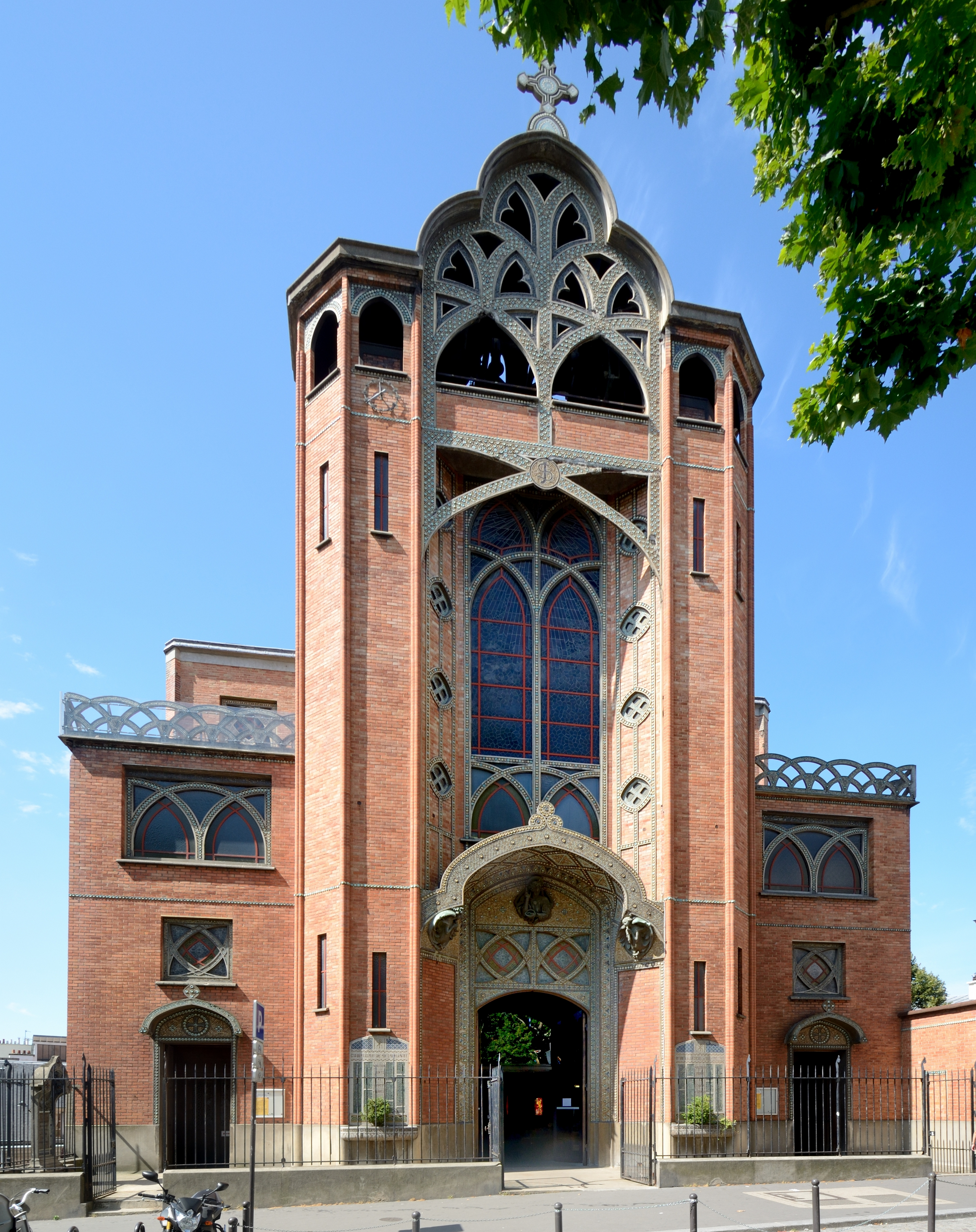
- Church of Saint-Jean de Montmartre
- 48°53′02.78″N 02°20′16.38″E
- Location: 18th arrondissement of Paris
- Country: France
- Denomination: Roman Catholic Church

Saint-Jean de Montmartre (French pronunciation: [sɛ̃ ʒɑ̃ d(ə) mɔ̃maʁtʁ]) is a Roman Catholic parish church located at 19 Rue des Abbesses in the 18th arrondissement of Paris.

Situated at the foot of Montmartre, it was built from 1894 to 1904. It is notable for its innovative use of reinforced concrete, a pioneering technique championed by architect Anatole de Baudot. The church blends Art Nouveau aesthetics, characterized by organic forms and decorative ceramic tilework, with Gothic structural elements such as pointed arches. Its iron frame and façade distinguish it from traditional Parisian churches, reflecting early 20th-century architectural experimentation.

The totality of the church was classified as a historic monument on 9 September 2014.

== History ==
The Church of Saint-Jean-Montmartre was the project of Montmartre priest Father Sobbeaux. The population of the neighborhood was growing and the only other church, Saint-Pierre de Montmartre was too small and was located at the top of the hill of Montmartre, and was too far to walk for many of the residents who lived at the bottom. The new church was part of Father Sobbeaux's personal mission to evangelize the population of the lower part of the hill, and he was responsible for raising all the funds for construction.

=== Construction ===
The new church was designed by architect Anatole de Baudot (1834-1915), a student of Viollet-le-Duc and Henri Labrouste. The reinforced cement structure followed a system patented by the engineer Paul Cottancin in 1892. The church was first religious building in France to be built from reinforced concrete. The use of this material greatly increased the strength and reduced the cost of the building, and allowed Baudot to win the competition.

This method used wire-reninforced, perforated brickwork as the permanent framework of a cement armature, together with thin, lightweight cement shells. The strength provided by the reinforced concrete allowed the church to have thinner walls supporting vaulted ceilings. Previously, the heavy stone vaults had to be accompanied by thick walls that could handle the weight and thrust of the vault.

Using reinforced concrete on Saint-Jean-de-Montmartre was ahead of its time and building codes had not caught up with the new technology. The building inspectors objected to a plan for twenty-five meter high columns that were only 50 centimeters in diameter, and outer walls only seven centimeters thick. Even some other architects opposed the plan, believing it would collapse. Construction was stopped as a result of a lawsuit filed in 1898 for " non-conformity of town planning".

The construction halt was followed by an order for the demolition of completed portions of the building. To save the church, Baudot and Sobbeaux set up technical demonstrations, and made full-scale models of the columns in the garden of the church to demonstrate its strength and stability.This demonstration reassured the skeptics, the demolition order was lifted, and construction resumed. The church was finally consecrated in 1904.

== Exterior ==
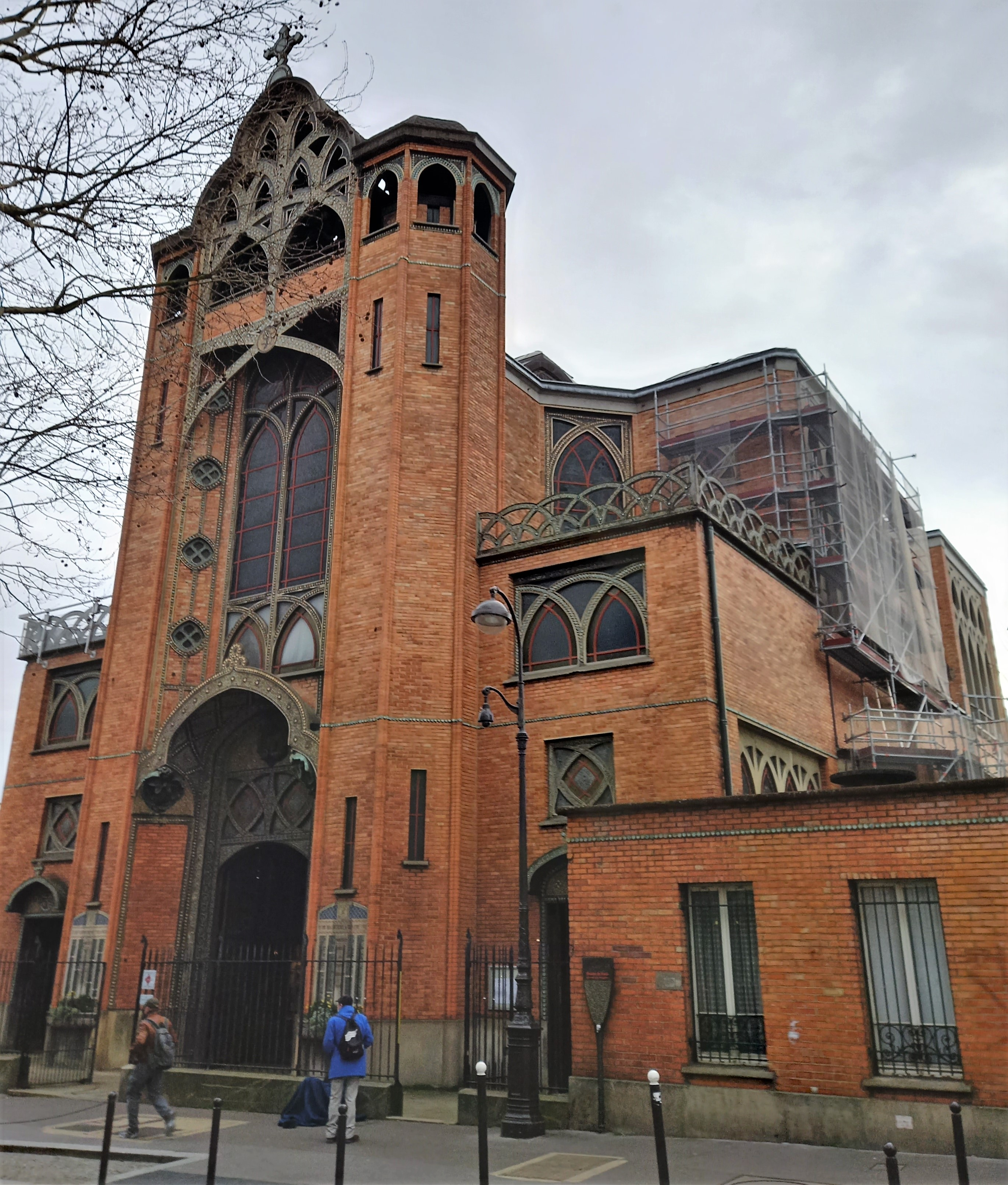
Exterior

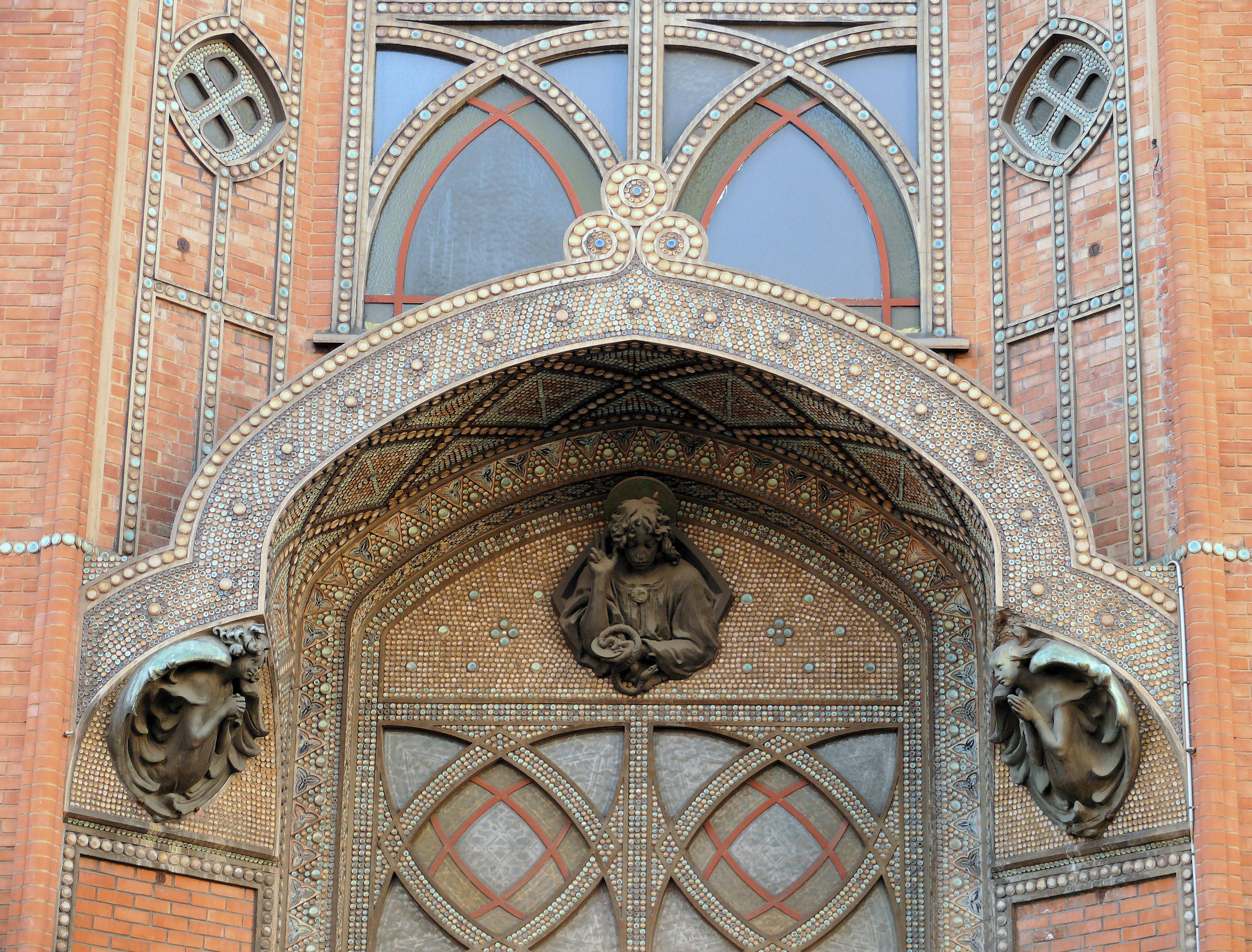
Ceramics and sculpture over the portal

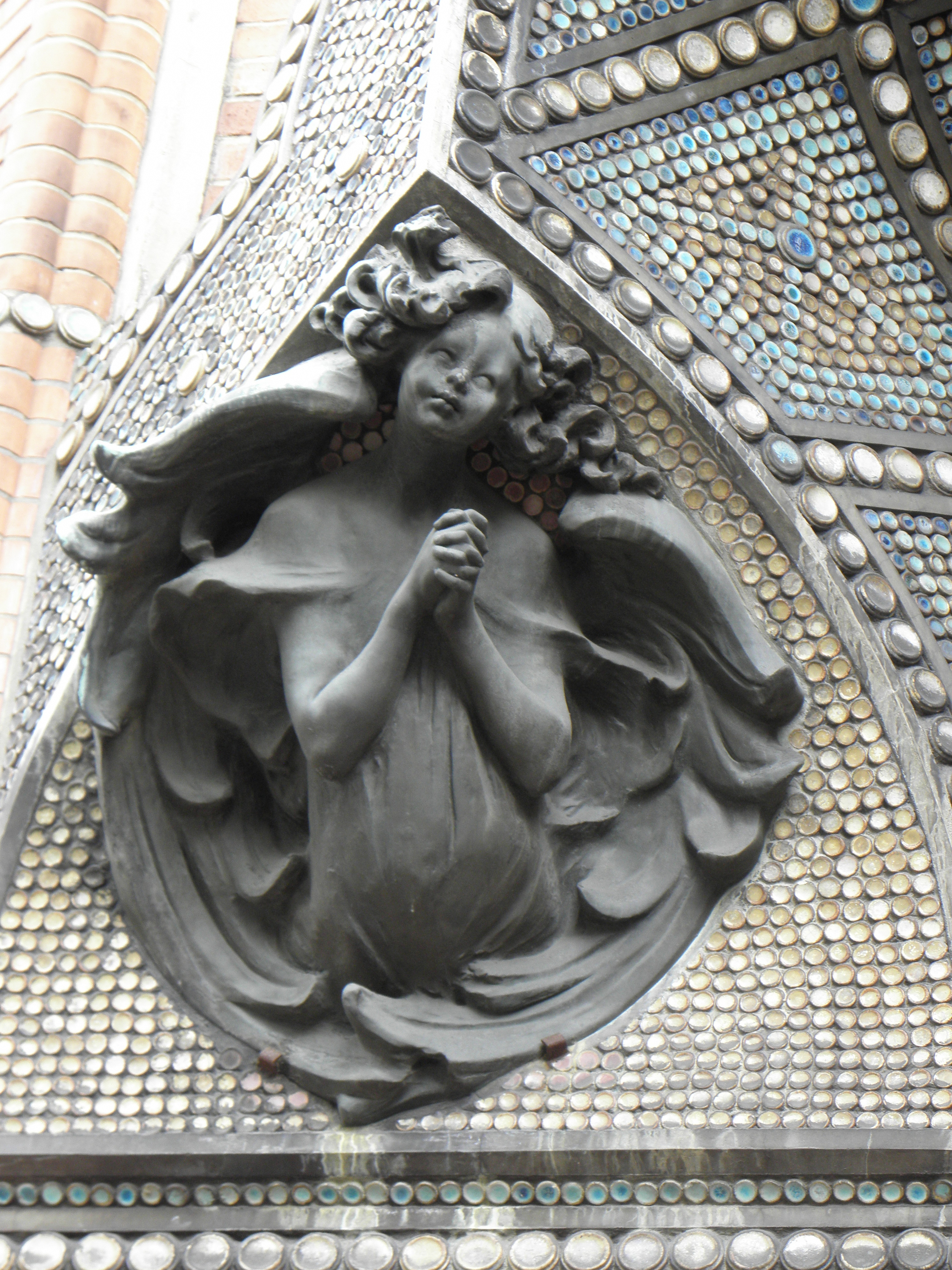
An angel over the portal by Pierre Roche

The facade of the church is covered with red brick, which also provided additional support and helped insulate the interior. This gave the church the nickname "Saint-Jean-of-the Bricks". The portal is also decorated with elaborate ceramic designs and sculpture by Alexandre Bigot, and, over the central portal, images of angels and saints by Pierre Roche (1855-1892. Roche's work is also found in the Luxembourg Gardens. The theme of the exterior and interior design is based on the writings of St. John- The fourth Gospel and the Apocalypse.

== Interior ==
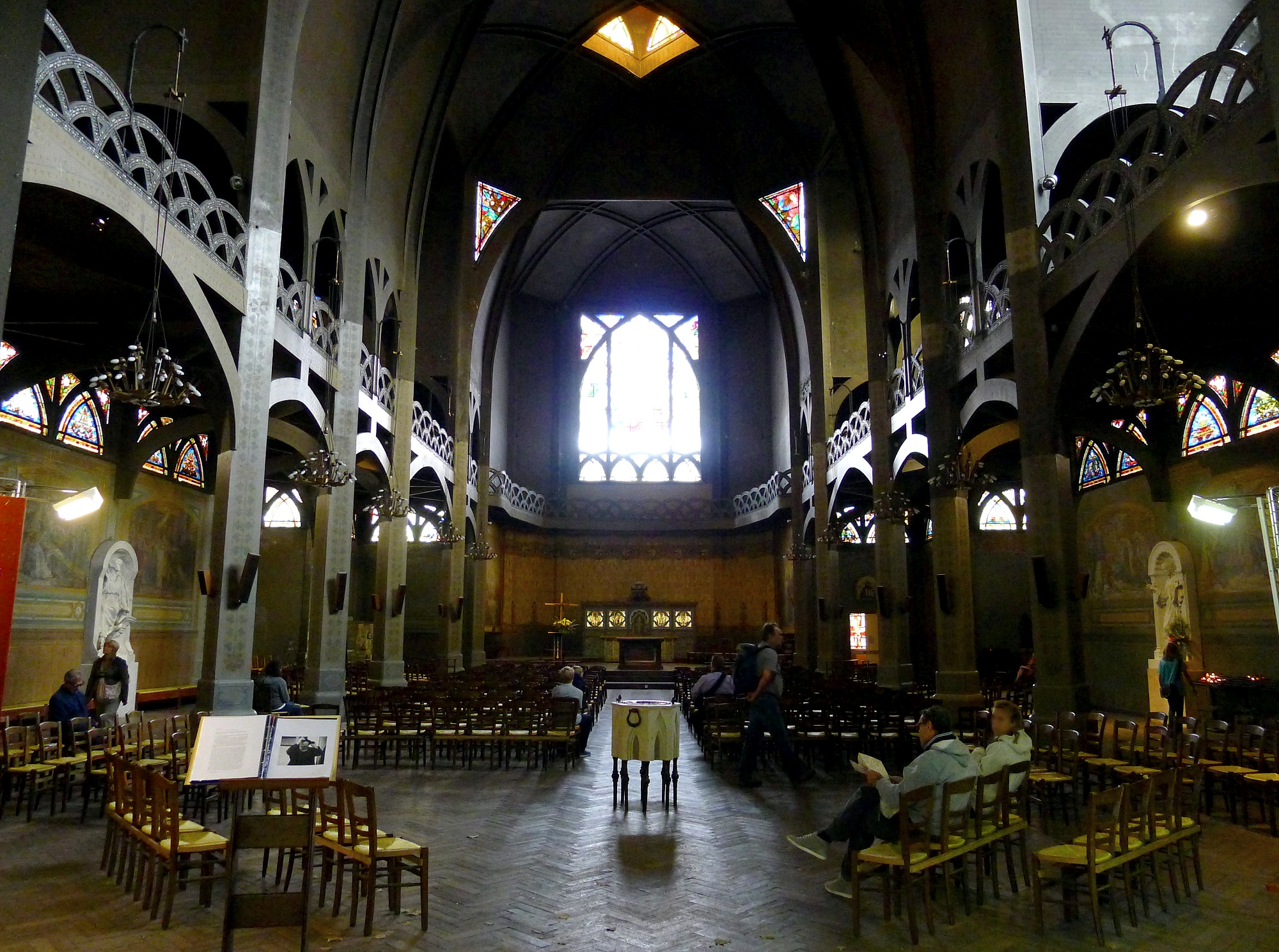
The nave facing the altar, showing the lightweight steel framework.

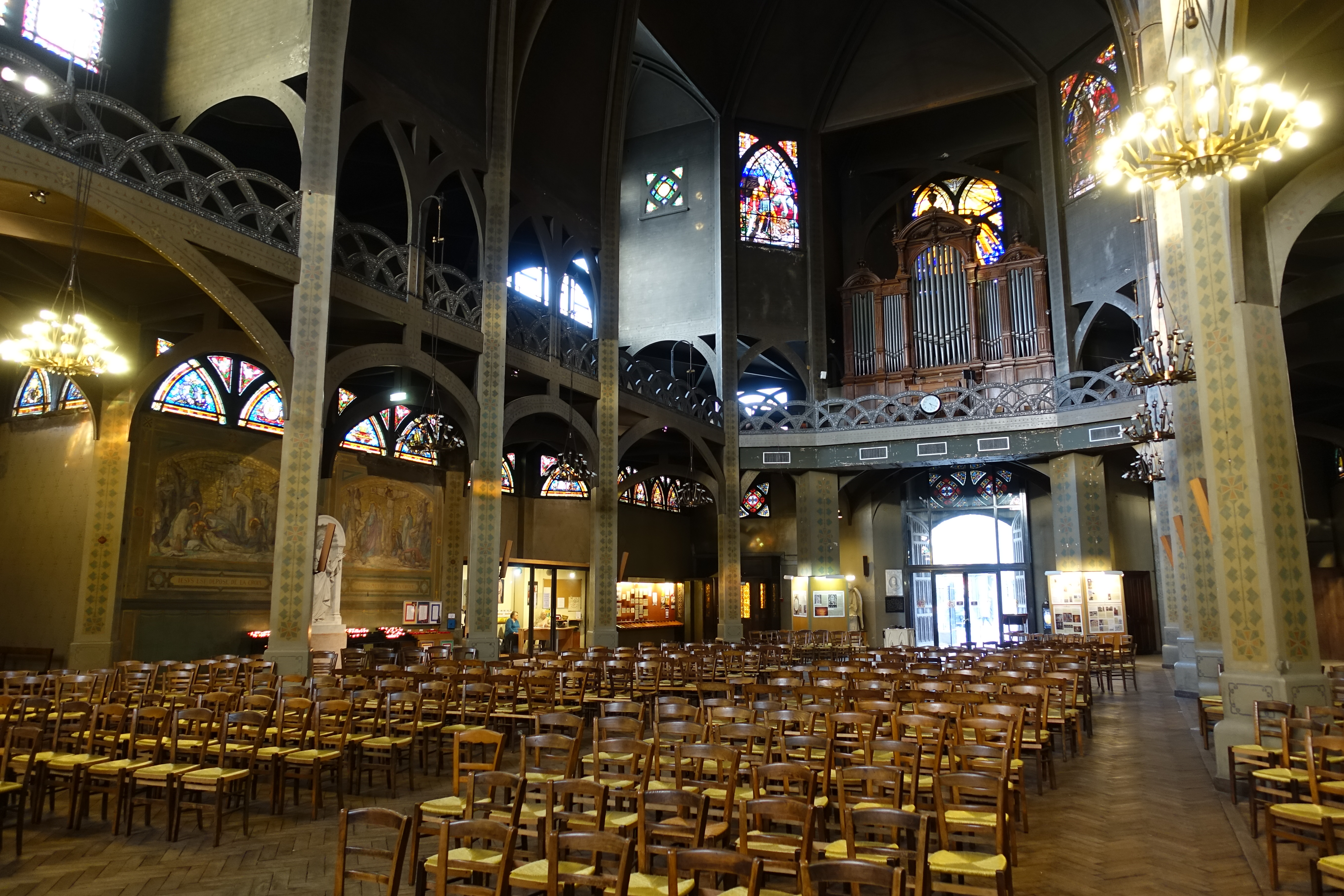
The nave facing the portal

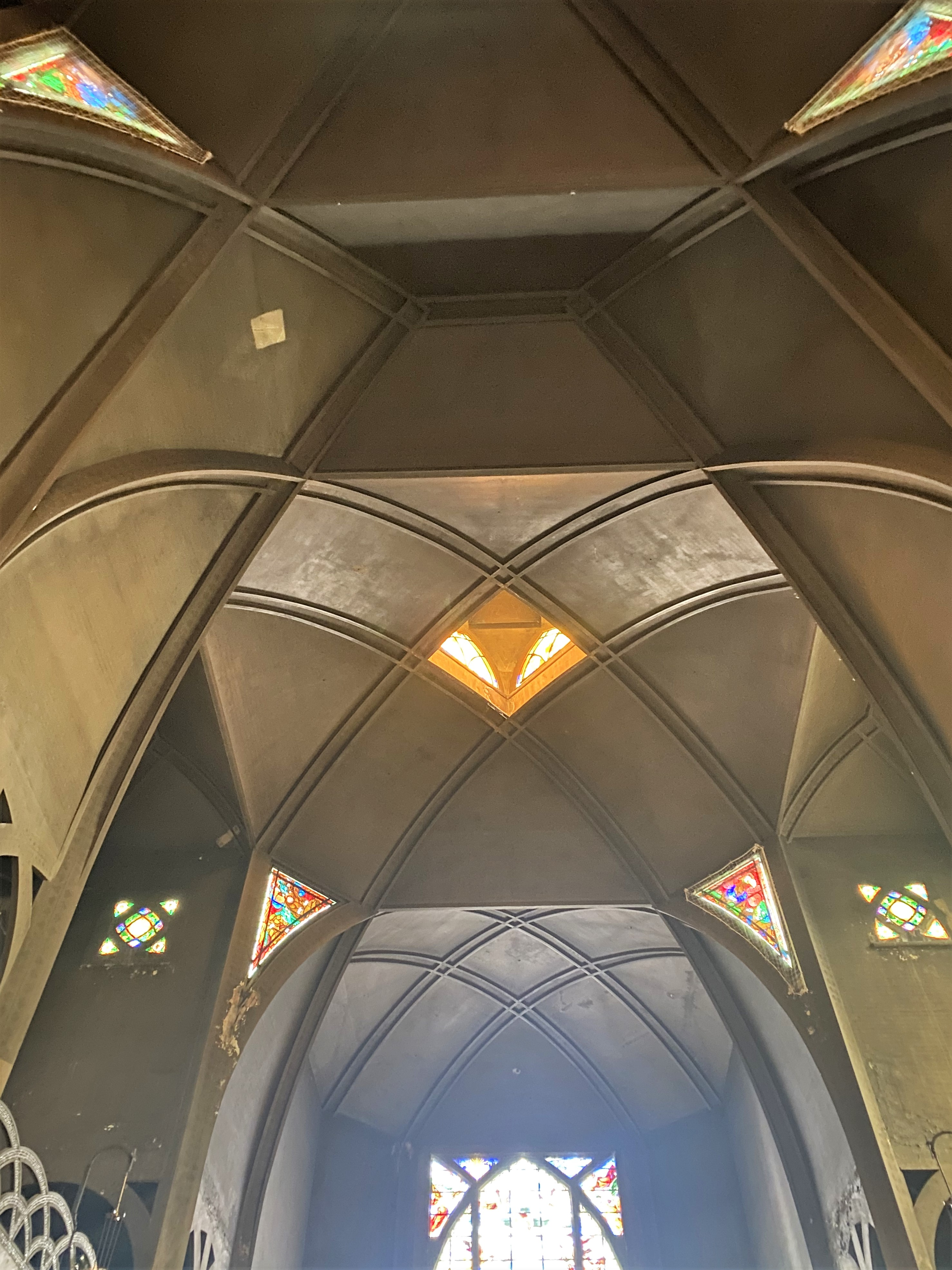
Vaults of the Nave

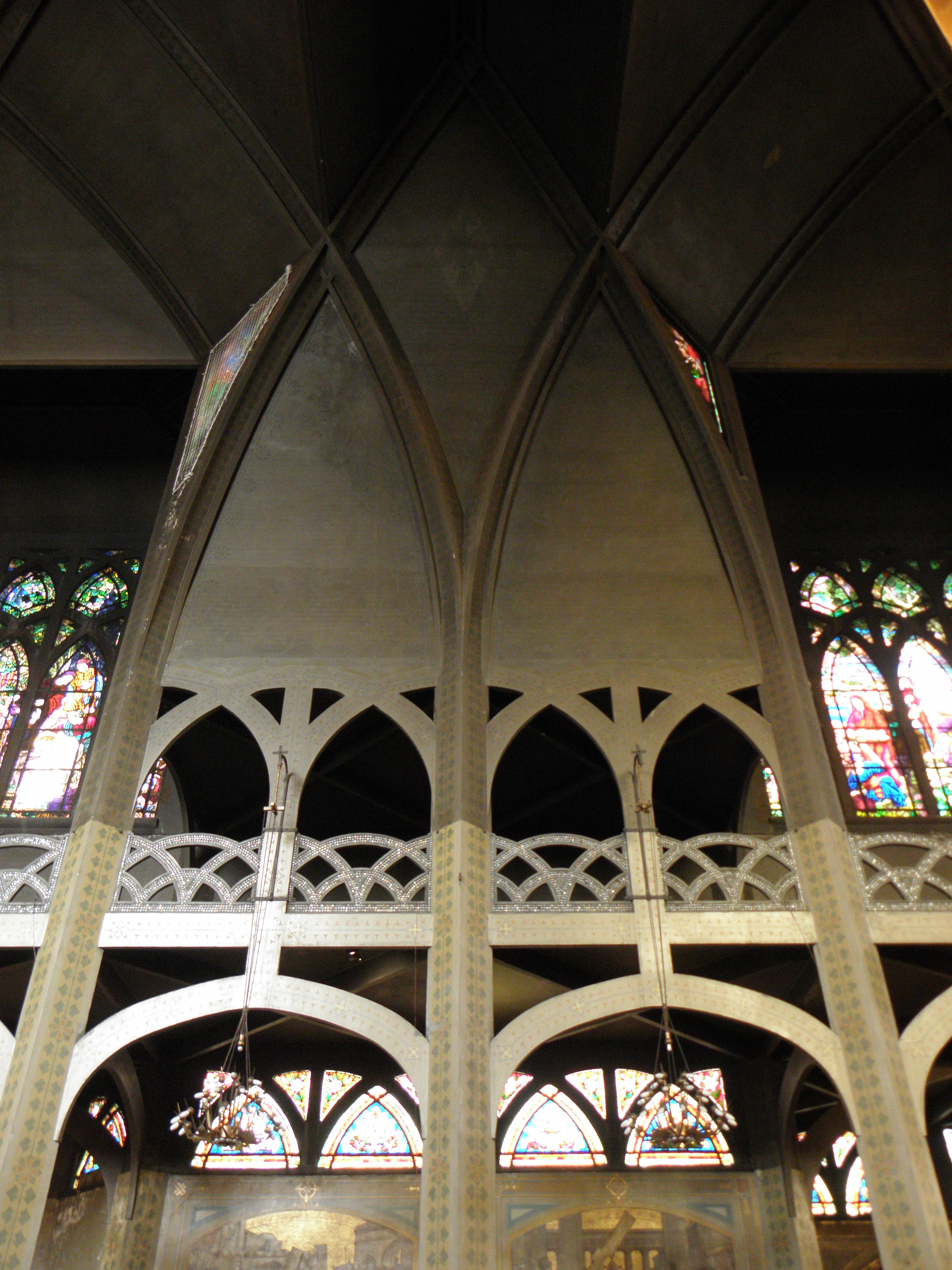
Grand arcades, tribunes and vaults

The arcades and tribunes in the interior are gray reinforced concrete and dimly lit. this darkness contrasts with the bright triangular stained glass windows along the nave, and the immense windows that fill the space over the choir.

The main altar in the choir is a particularly elaborate and colourful work, covered with mosaics by Guraud. It also displays a series of five medallions sculpted of bronze. These were made by Pierre Roche, and illustrate the attributes of the Evangelists; they include a bull, the attribute of Saint Luke, and a lion, the attribute of Saint Mark.

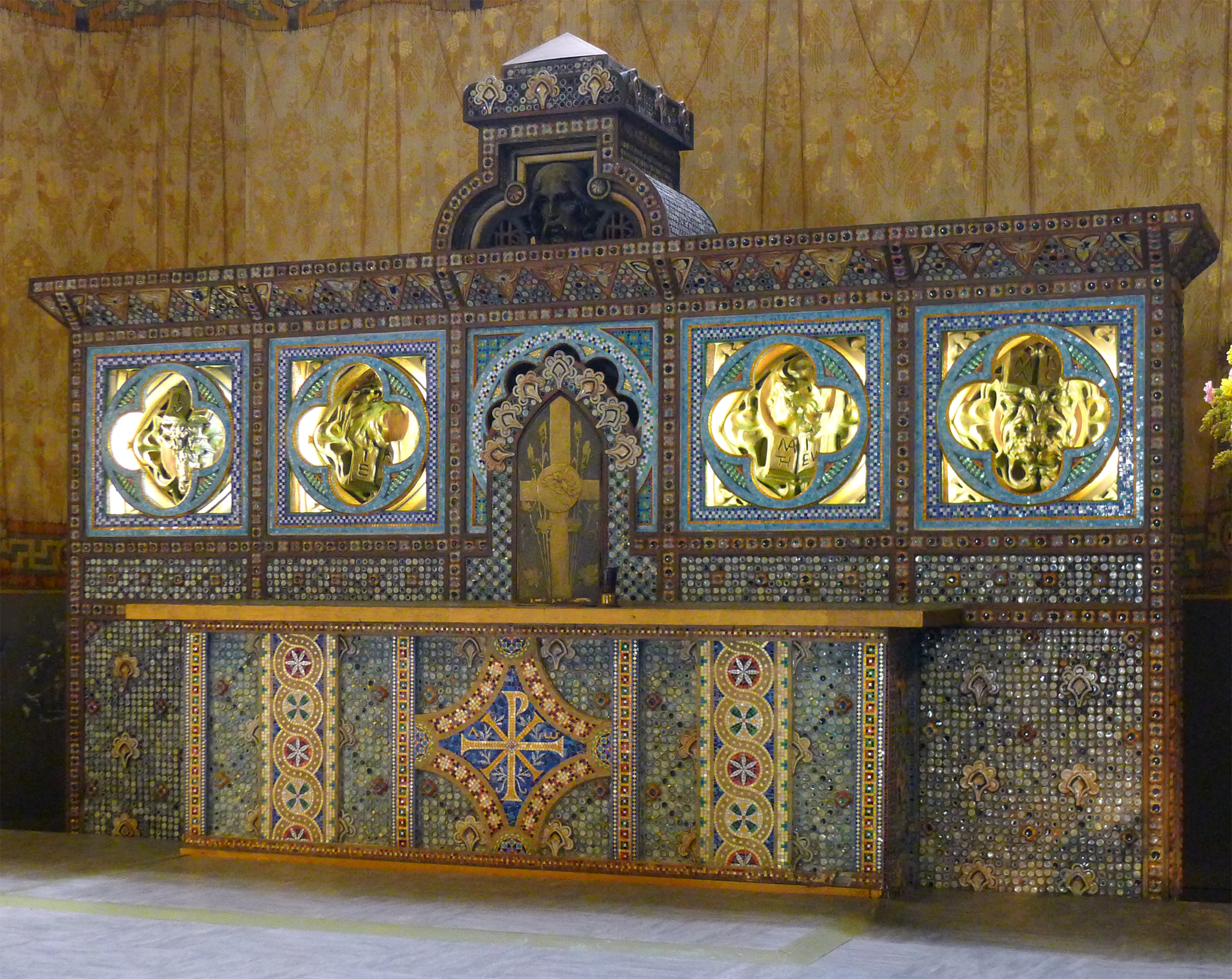
The main altar in the choir

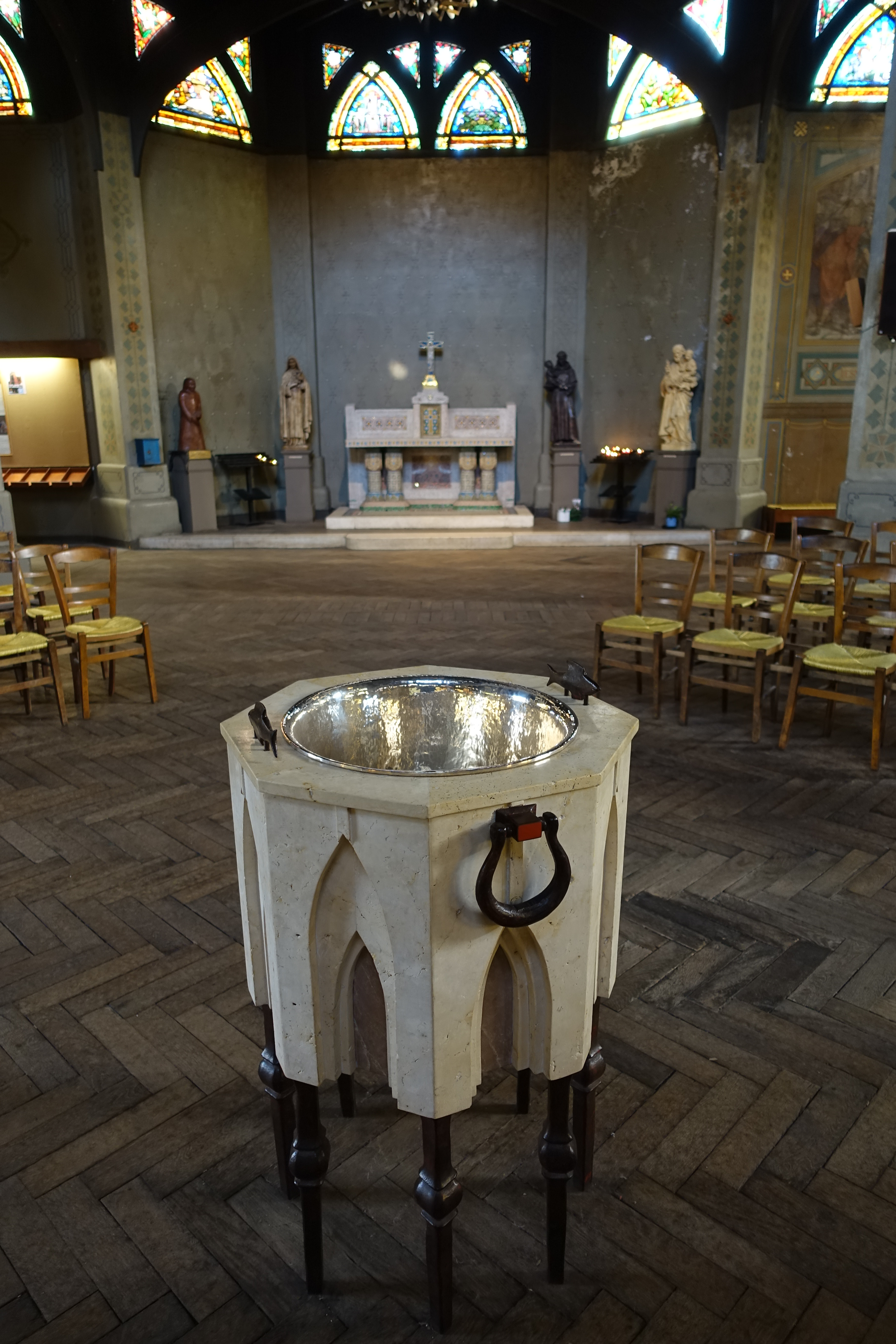
The Baptismal Font

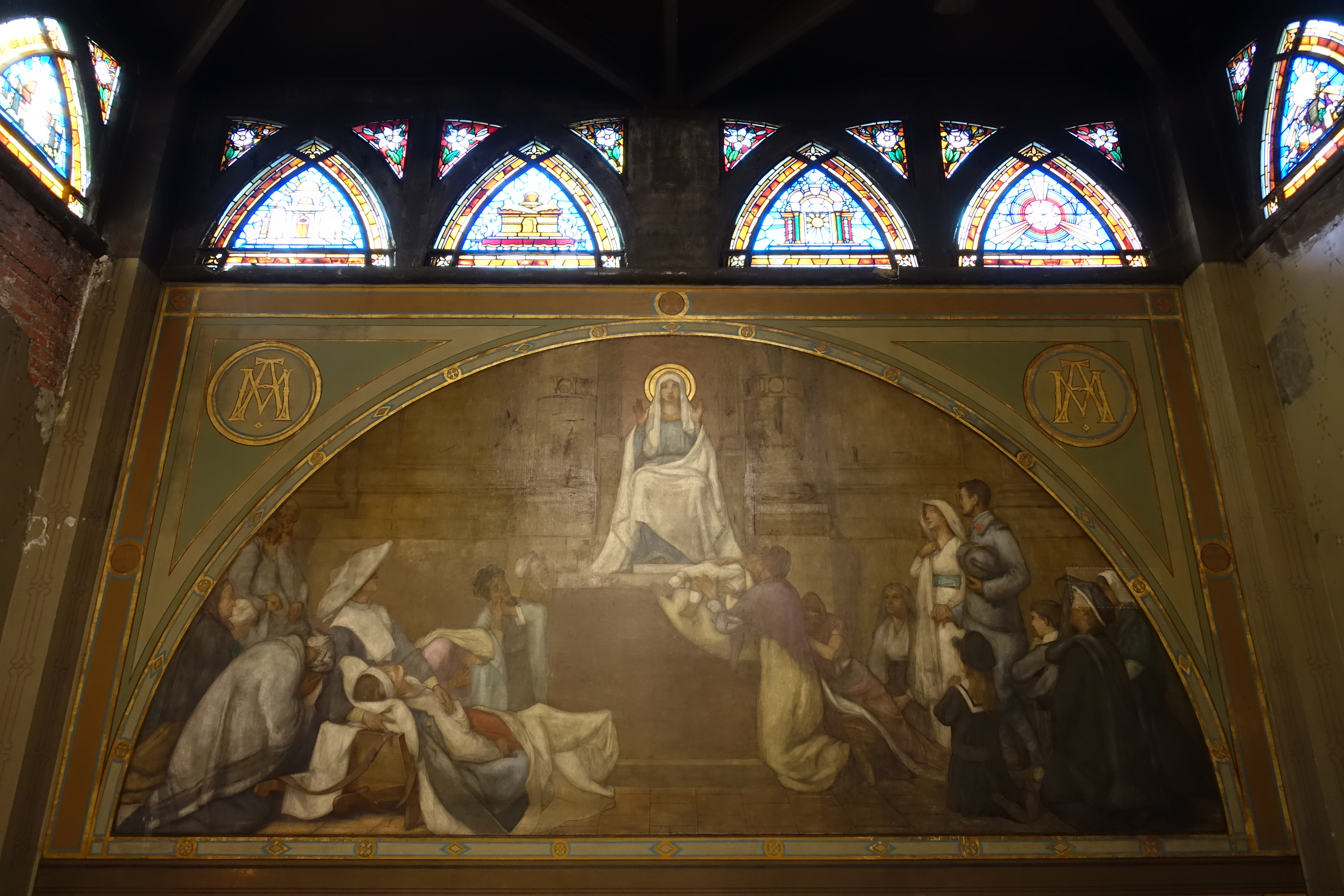
"Mary, Consoler of the afflicted" by Eugene Thierry (1875-1961)

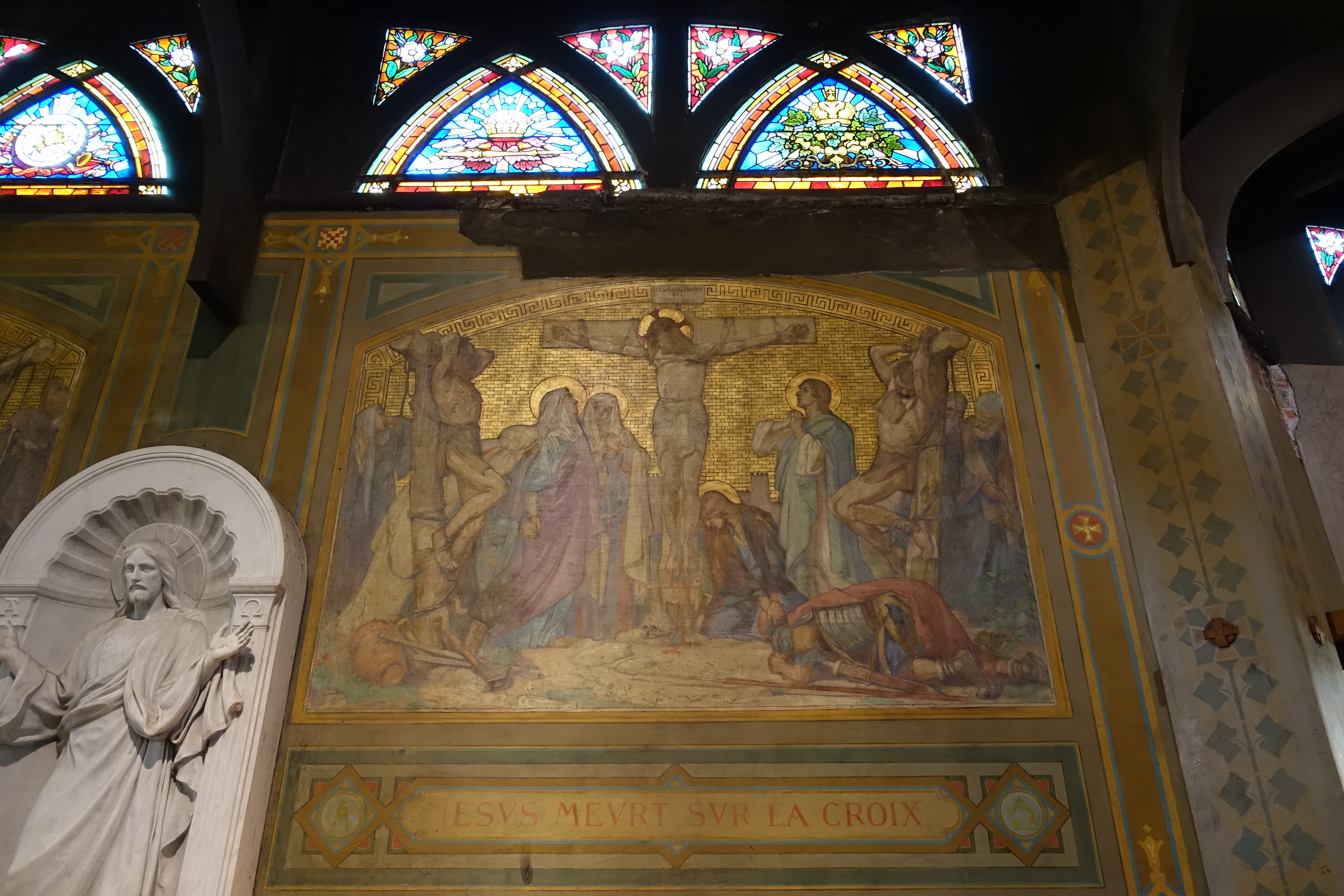
"Jesus dying on the Cross" by Eugene Thierry

The interior of the church, along the outer aisles, displays four mural paintings, the work of Eugene Thierry (1875-1961). These include "Christ dying on the Cross" and "Mary, Colsolatrice of the Afflicted".

== Stained Glass ==
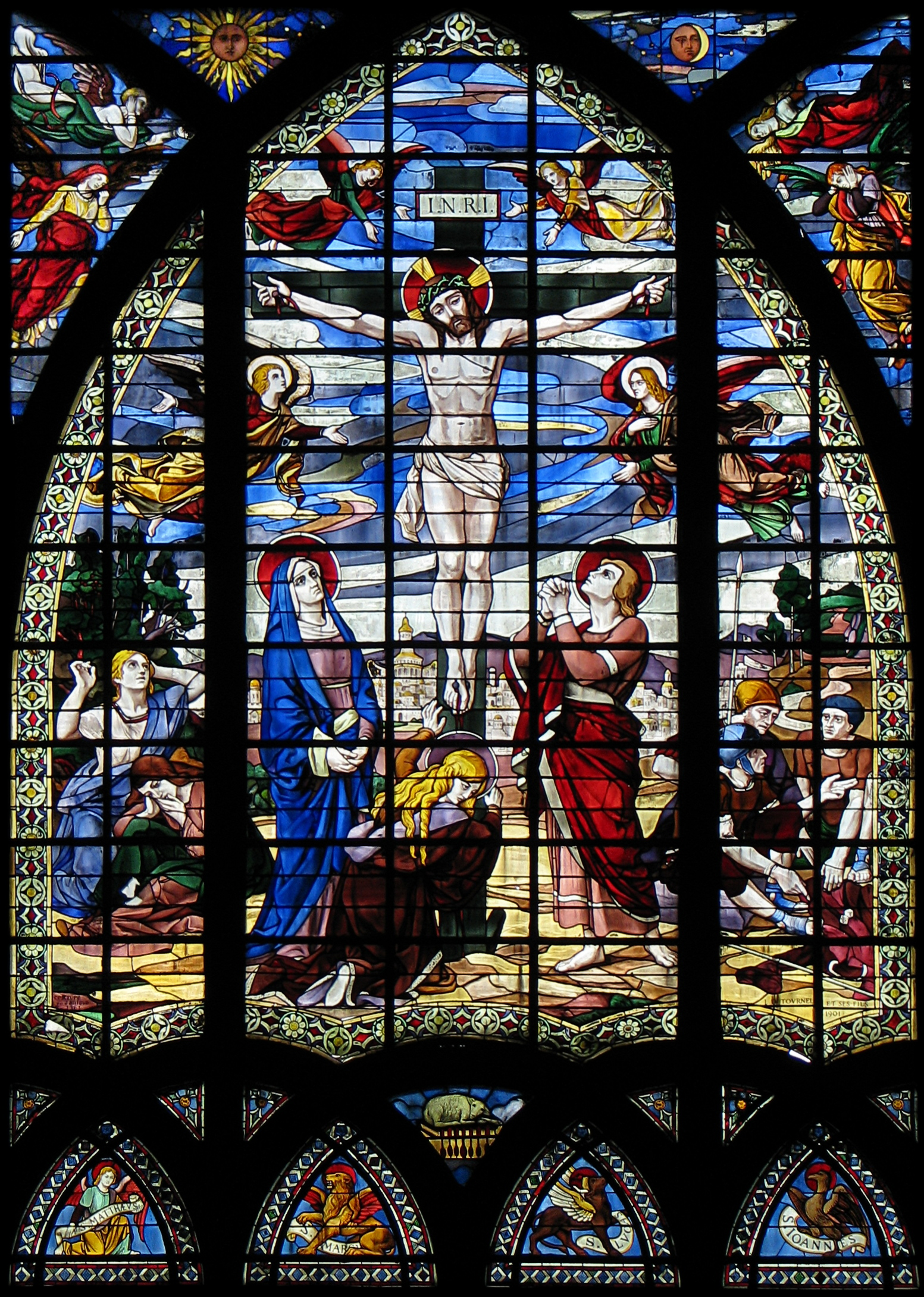
"The Crucifixion", the central window over the altar in the choir

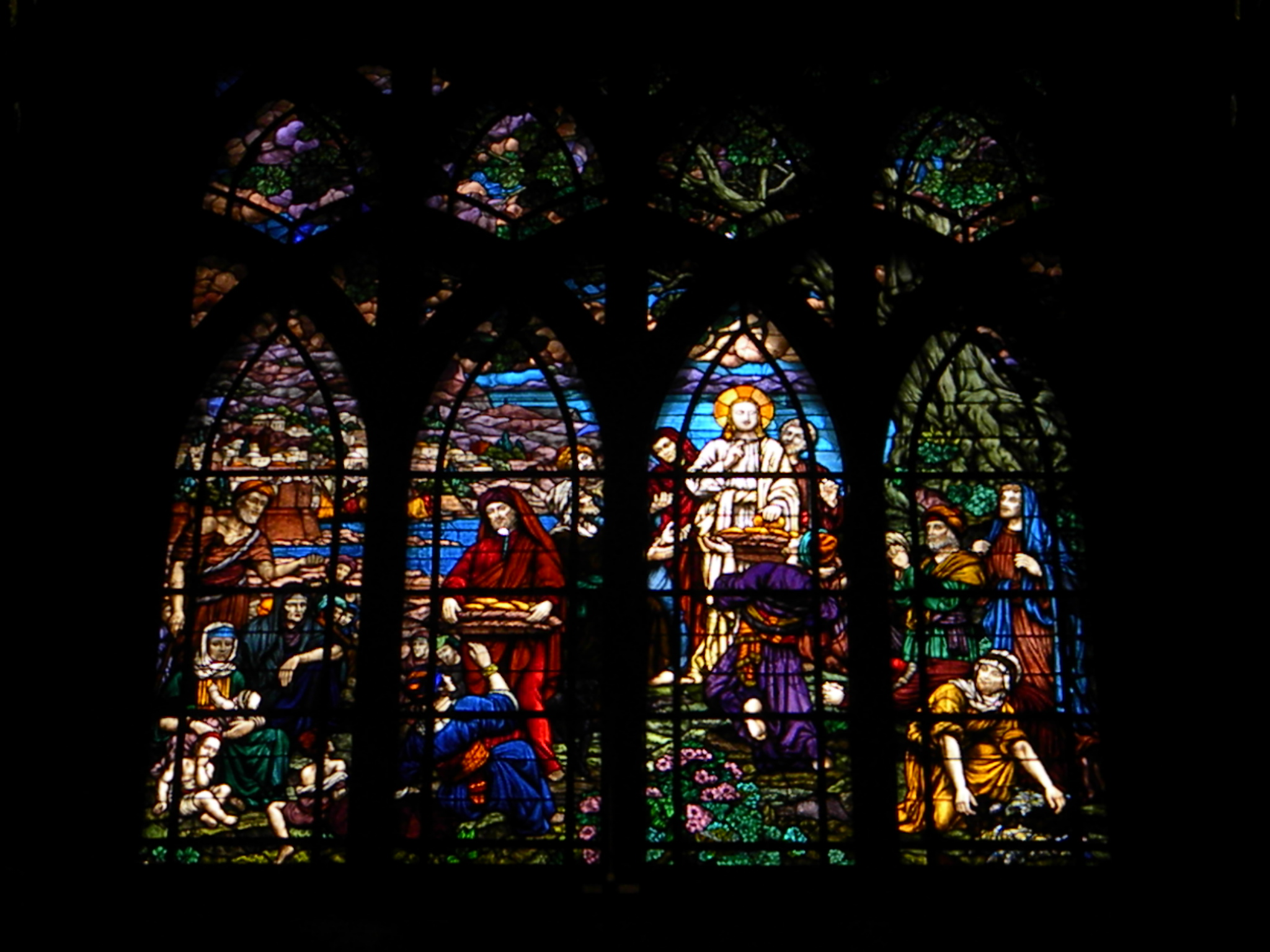
"Christ multiplies loaves for distribution to the poor", by glass artist Jac Galland from a design by Pascall Blanchard.

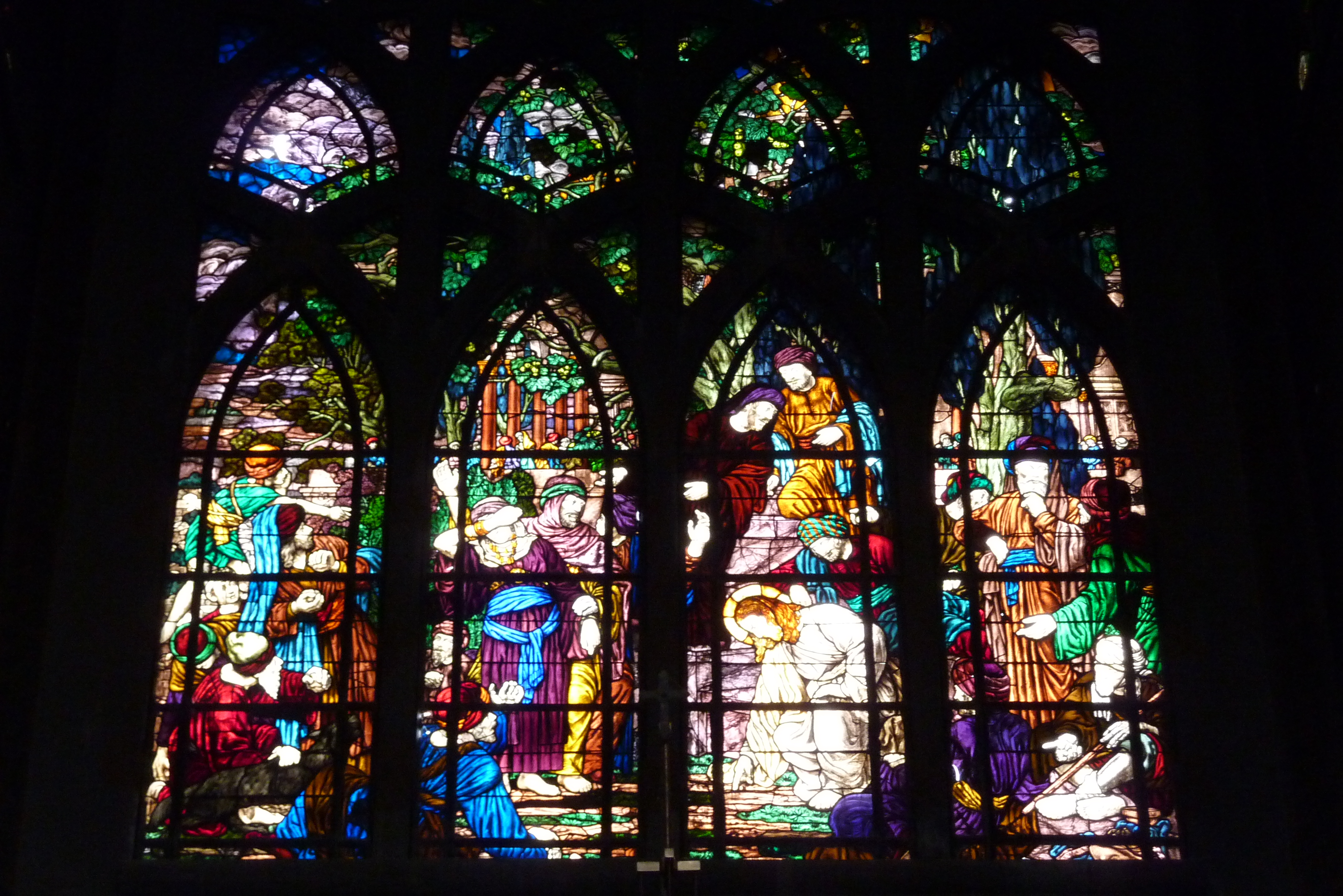
"Christ saves an Adultress from Stoning" by Jac Galland and Pascal Blanchard

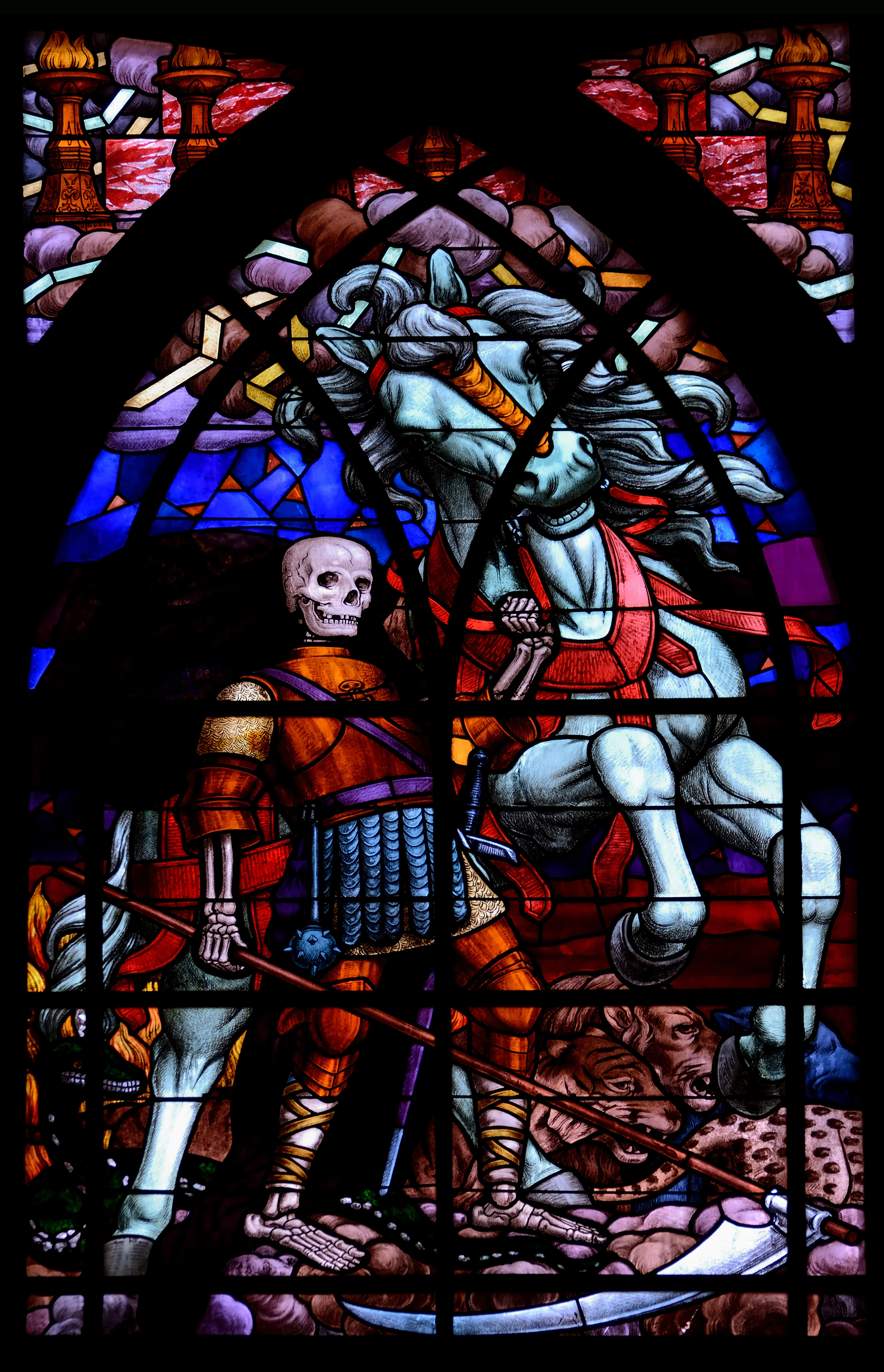
"The 4th Horseman of the Apocalypse" by Jac Galland

The church has a very fine collection of Art Nouveau stained glass. The central window over the altar is "The Crucifixion", by Léon Tournel, made in 1906. (Click image twice for full enlargement).

Two windows very vividly depicting two of the Four Horsemen of the Apocalypse. They are found in the Tribune, on either side of the grand organ.

The nave displays another very elaborate and colourful set of four windows illustrating Christ performing miracles. halting a mob from stoning an adultress. These windows were made by glass designer Jac Galland, based on a drawing by Pascal Blanchard.

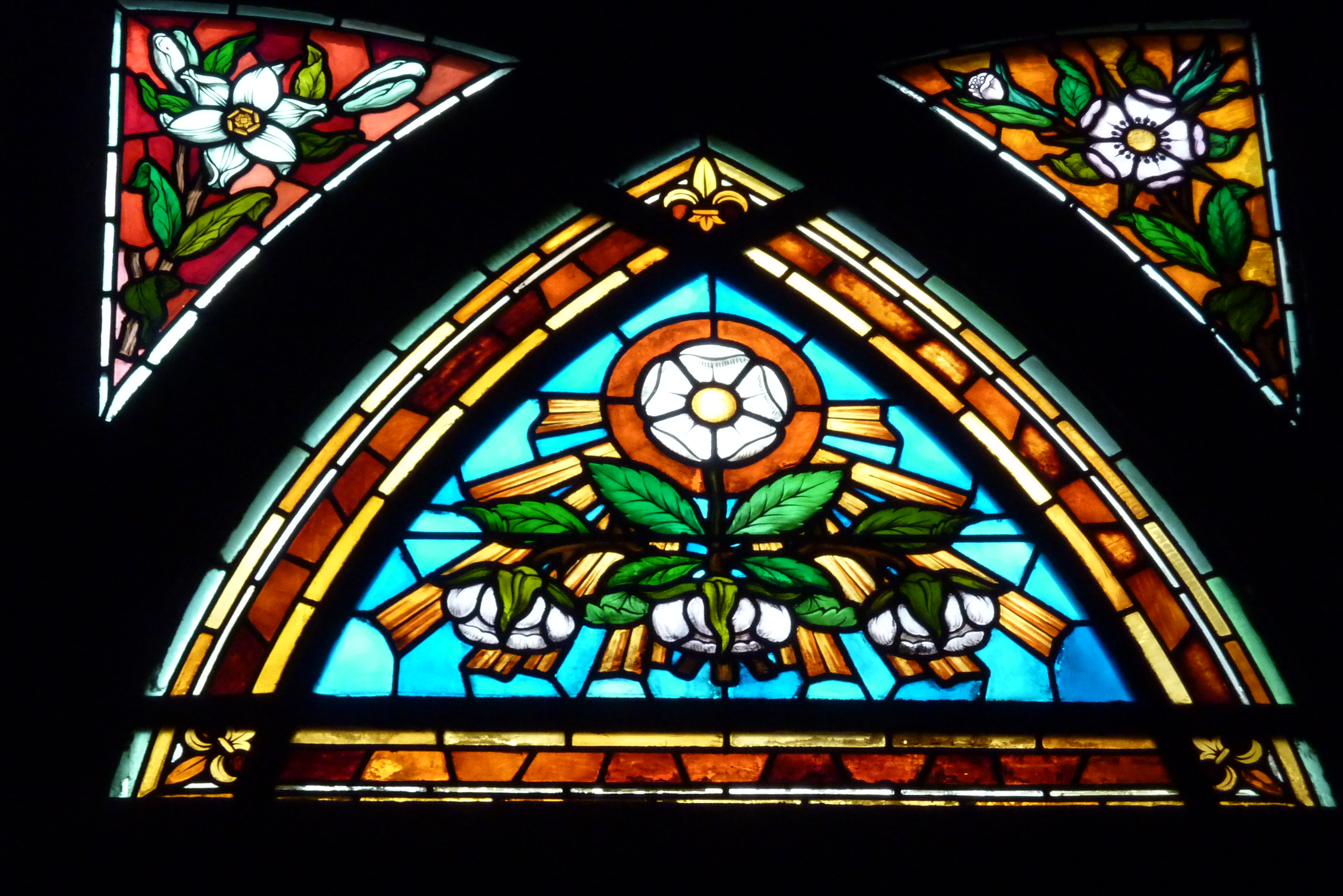
"Litanies of the Virgin"

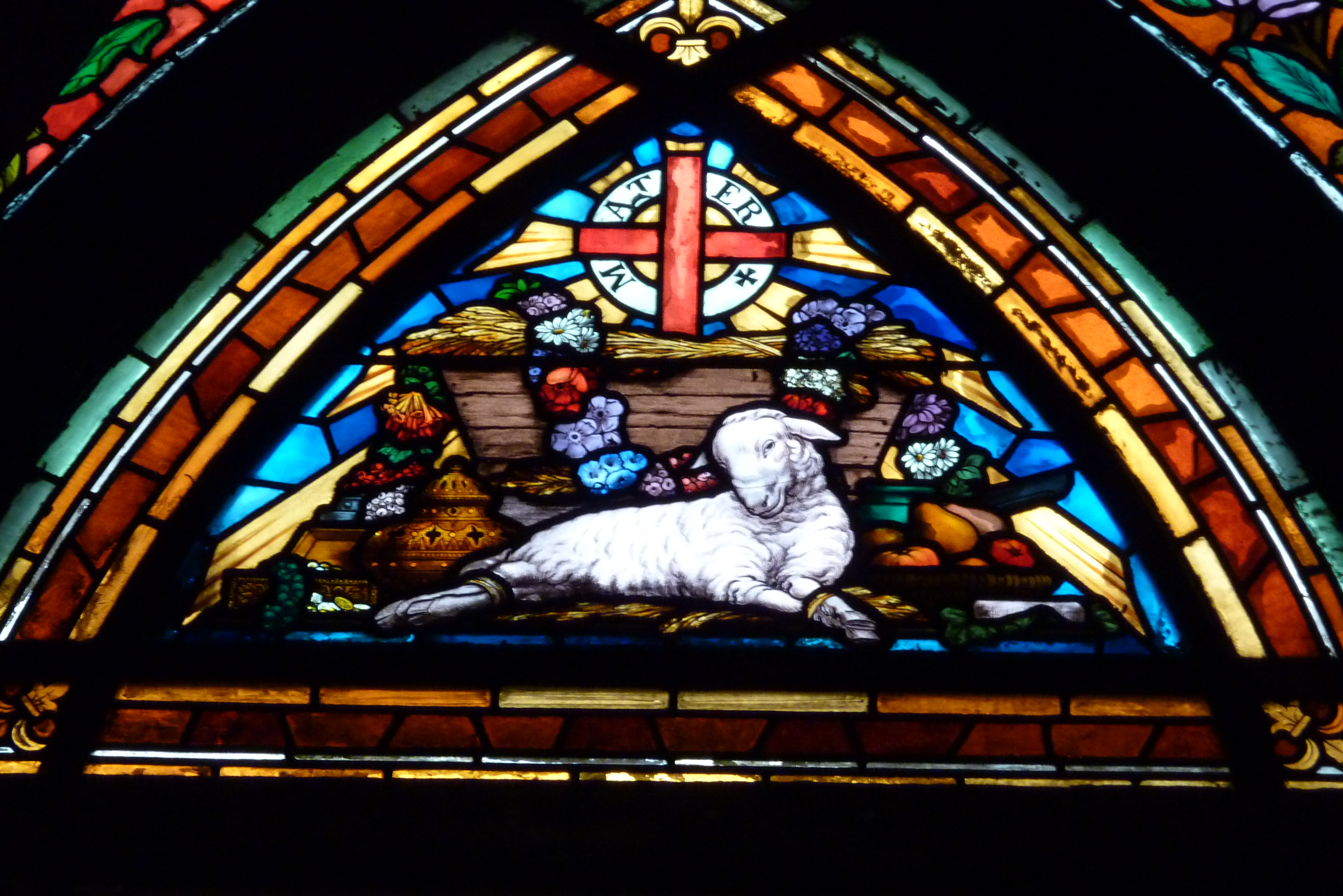
"Litanies of the Virgin - The Lamb

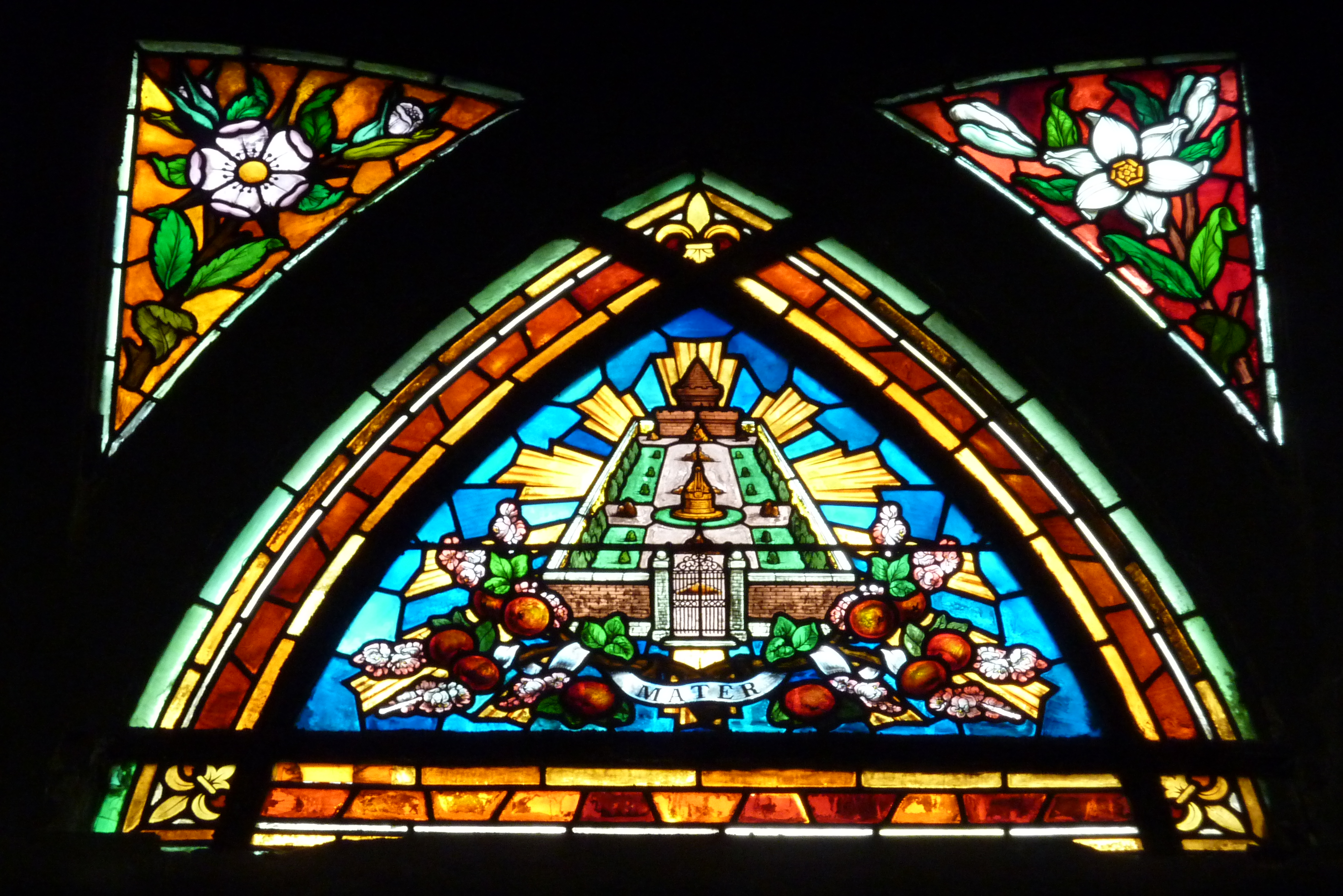

In addition to the larger and more elaborate windows, the sides of the nave are decorated with forty-eight colorful smaller triangular windows, illustrating the Litanies of the Virgin, and virtues associated with her.

== Organ ==
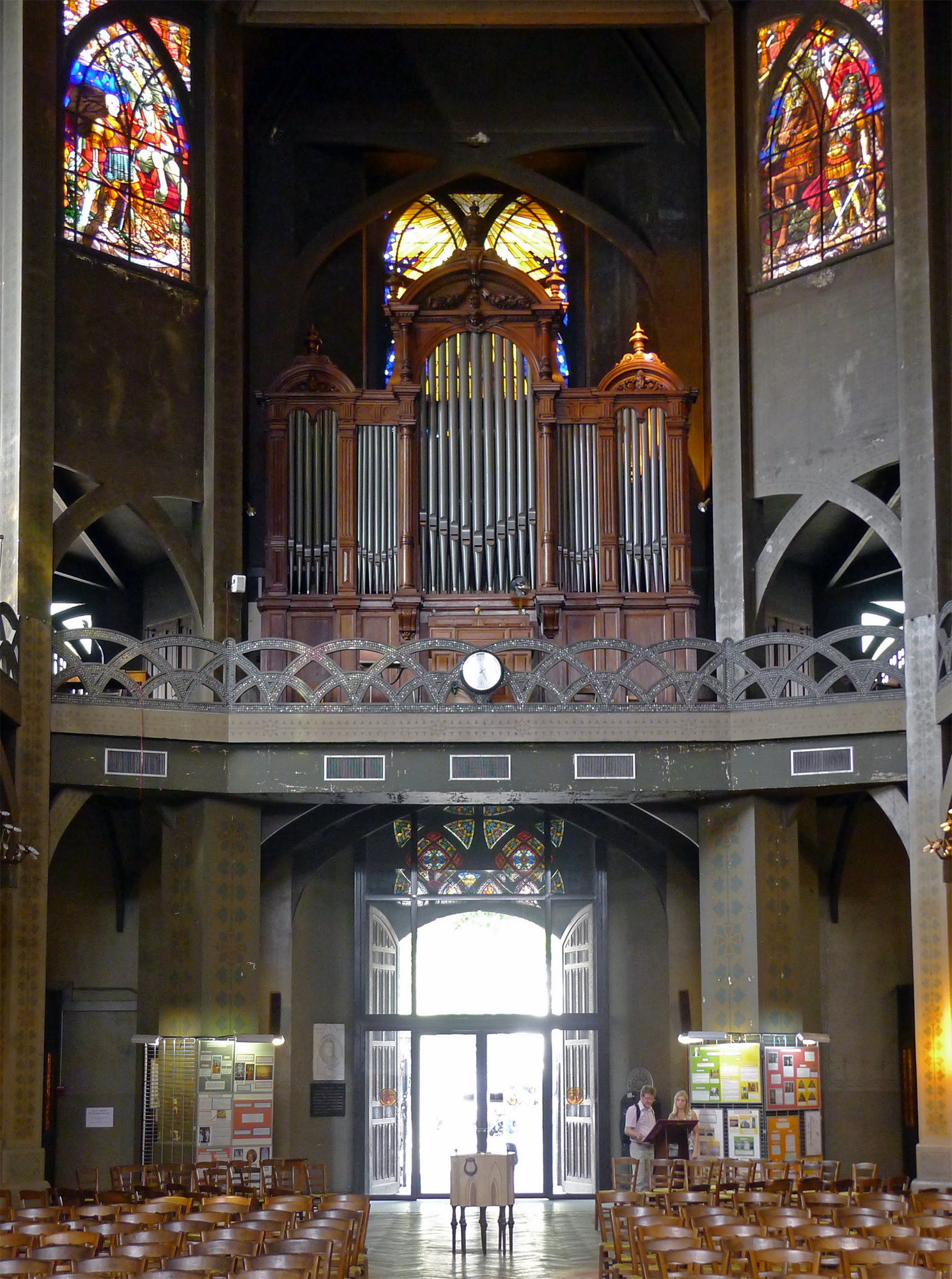
The pipe organ located above the portal

The pipe organ of Saint-Jean-de-Montmartre was originally built by Cavaillé-Coll in 1852 for a school, the École Sacré-Cœur de la Ferrandière in Lyon. It was moved and rebuilt in its new home in 1910 and enlarged in 1921, 1931 and 1934 by Gutschenritter. It was renovated in 1979 by Jacques Barbéris. The organ's condition started to deteriorate in 1986 and became practically unplayable by 2009. The City of Paris appointed the organbuilder Yves Fossaert to restore the instrument. This project, entirely financed by the City of Paris, began in 2009 and lasted fourteen months.
