= Lycée Edmond Perrier =

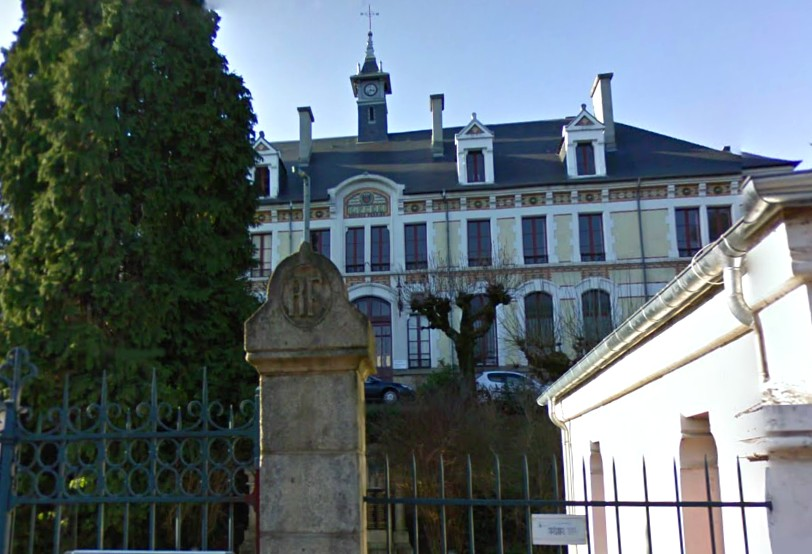

Location
- 6, avenue Henry de Bournazel; Tulle, Limousin 19000; France; 45.267375°N 1.76881°E

Information
- School type: Public
- Motto: Sint rupes virtutis iter
- Established: 1567
- School district: Limoges academy
- Average class size: 35
- Language: French, English, Spanish, German, Russian, Italian, Latin, Ancient Greek
- Classrooms: 30
- Website: edmondperrier.fr

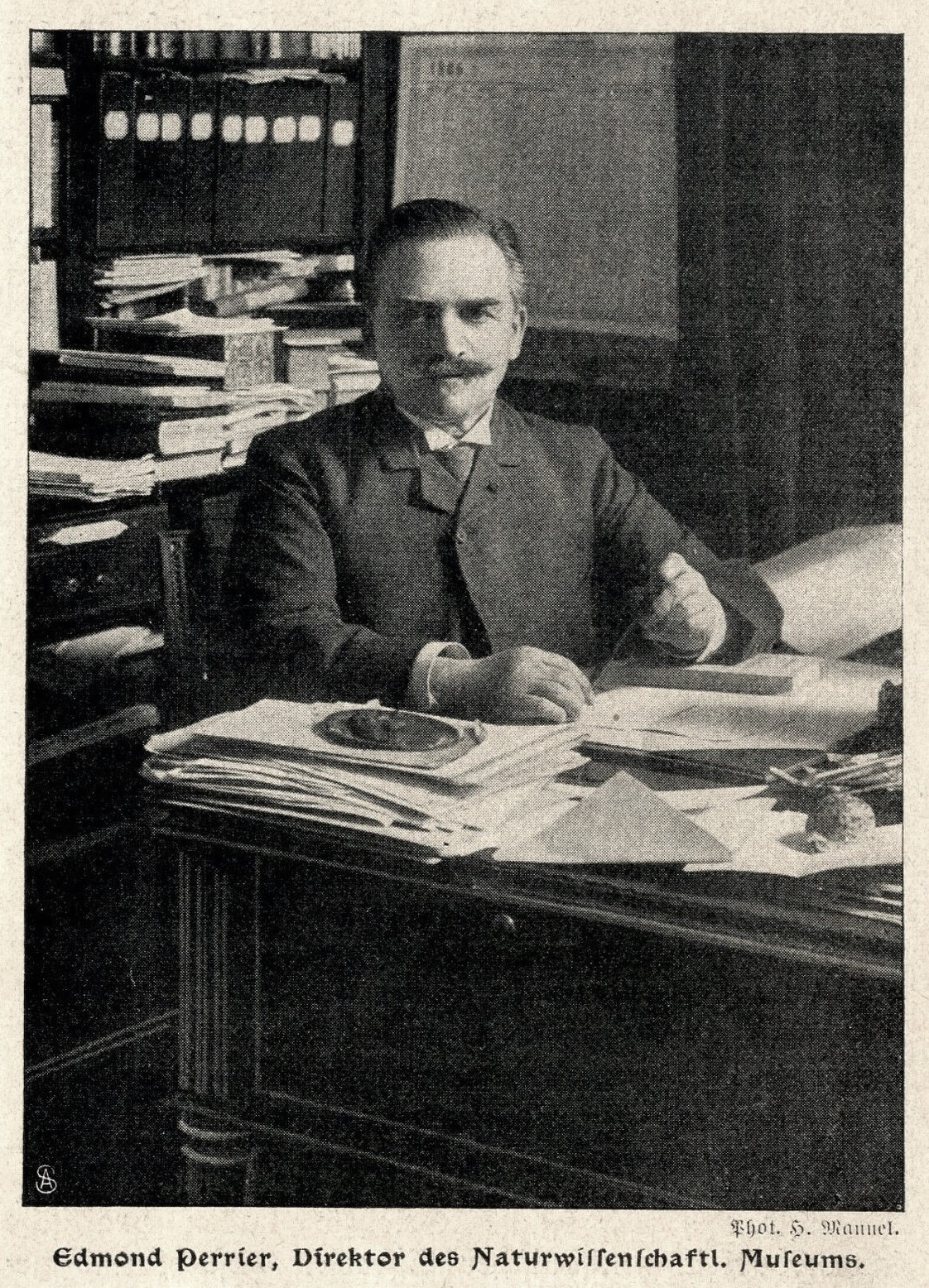
Edmond Perrier (1844-1921)

The Lycée Edmond Perrier (Edmond Perrier high school) is a general and technical secondary education institution, located in Tulle, Correze. It is dedicated to zoologist Edmond Perrier, born in Tulle in 1844. It was built by Anatole de Baudot, and has many similarities with the Lycée Lakanal, due to the same architect. His motto is "Sint rupes virtutis iter", identical to that of Tulle which means "The difficulties are the path of virtue".

== History ==
=== Tulle college (1567–1883) ===
The Lycée Edmond Perrier succeeded to the college of Tulle, which dates from 1567. From 1620 the college was run by the Jesuits, then it was the turn of Theatine who manage it from 1764 until 1791.

=== Tulle high school (1883–1923) ===
A resolution of the City Council 2 April 1878 proposed the idea of transforming the college into high school. A decree of 20 March 1883, signed by President Jules Grévy create the High School of Tulle.

The Buildings were designed by the architect Anatole de Baudot and they were inaugurated on 1 October 1887. The buildings are made to provide comfort to students with large windows, high ceilings, heated rooms and an ideal living environment, which was revolutionary for its time.

4 August 1914, just three days after the start of World War I, the school served as a barracks in the 300th Infantry Regiment. A week later, it turned into a military hospital and receives its first wounded on 26 August. In October 1916 it became again a center for teaching and study.

=== Edmond Perrier high school (since 1923) ===
Tulle High School takes the name of Edmond Perrier, in honor of zoologist Edmond Perrier, who died two years earlier and who was a student at the College of Tulle. From 1945 to today, the school had three fires, the most important in May 1967. Fortunately, the front of the school was never reached by the flames. The school now houses about 1100 students, divided in general education (S (hard sciences), ES (economics and social sciences), L(humanities)) and technology (STG (Management Sciences and Technologies)), as well as higher education courses: BTS CGO (Accounting and management organizations ) and NRC (Negotiation and Customer Relations) and scientific preparatory classes for Grandes écoles.

== Former students ==
| Name | Position |
|---|---|
| Etienne Baluze | scholar |
| Edmond Perrier | zoologist |
| Henri Queuille | Prime Minister of France |
| Éric Rohmer | director |
| Marcel Conche | philosopher |
| René Teulade | former Minister of Social Affairs and Integration |
| Marie-Anne Montchamp | Secretary of State for Solidarity and Social cohesions |
| Jean-Jacques Aillagon | former Minister of Culture, former director of the Palace of Versailles |
| Benoît Mandelbrot | mathematician |
