= 18th-century prints of Bach's four-part chorales =

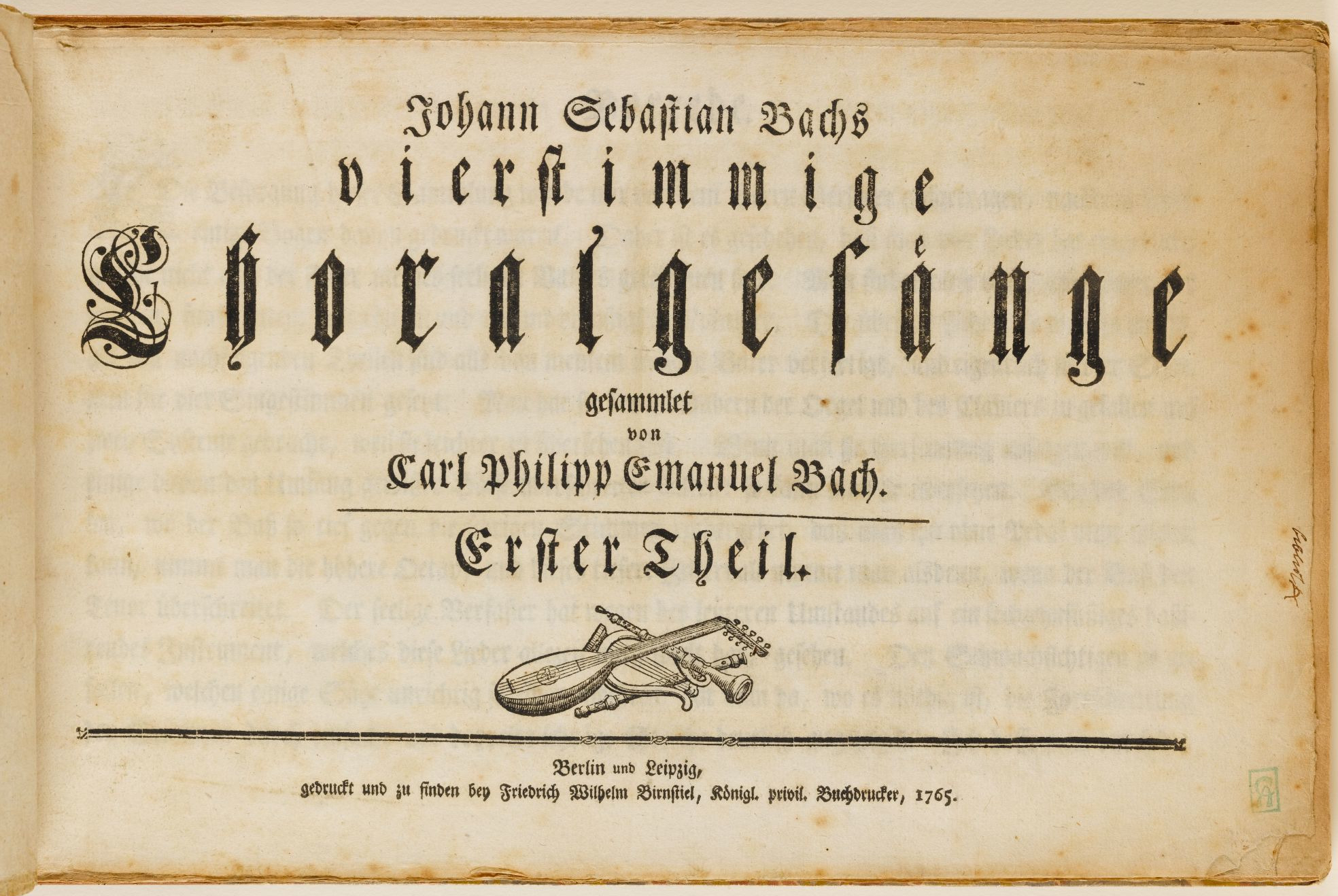
Birnstiel's first volume (1765): title page.

In the period following Johann Sebastian Bach's death in 1750, apart from the publication of The Art of Fugue in the early 1750s, the only further publications prior to the 1790s were the settings of Bach's four-part chorales. In 1758 Friedrich Wilhelm Marpurg was the first to start preparing a published edition of Bach's four-part chorales, but in 1763 was prevented by royal duties. C. P. E. Bach, who owned the original manuscripts, then set about the same task, producing two volumes in 1765 and 1769. Dissatisfied with his publisher Friedrich Wilhelm Birnstiel, he surrendered the manuscript rights in 1771 to Johann Kirnberger and his patron Princess Anna Amalia of Prussia. From 1777 onwards, Kirnberger unsuccessfully made requests to Birnstiel and a new publisher, Johann Gottlob Immanuel Breitkopf, to publish the chorales. Following Kirnberger's death in 1783, C.P.E. Bach approached Breitkopf, who published them in four volumes between 1784 and 1787.

About half of the chorale harmonisations in this collection have their origin in other extant works by Bach.

== History ==
Bach's posthumous publications in the second half of the eighteenth century, like those printed during his life, gave the impression of a readership aimed at connoisseurs with a "learned" expertise in keyboard music. Thus only The Art of the Fugue and the four-part chorales were available in print prior to 1800. The demand in that period was partly affected by publishers' printing expenses and partly by changing tastes. Amongst amateurs, there was a market for more popular, tuneful and approachable repertoire: amongst professional musicians, however, manuscripts continued to be circulated through hand copies. In the nineteenth century fashions changed again: the Well-Tempered Clavier—a foundation-stone for musicians—was printed for the first time in 1801, followed by publications of complete editions of Bach's works throughout the century.

The task of engraving "The Art of the Fugue" was interrupted by Bach's death in 1750. Assisted by the family and former assistants, C.P.E. Bach and J.F. Agricola published an edition through subscription in 1751: few subscribers took up the offer. In 1752 a second edition was printed with a new foreword by F.W. Marpurg. Here he wrote that his aim was to instil "the dignity of Harmony" into the fugue and explained its importance both for "the music mechanic" knowing only "the fugue by name", as well as "the contemporary composer, who considers the fugue the child of ancient aberration, [in] the manly element which should prevail in music," as opposed to "the spreading rubbish of womanly song." The attempt at recruiting subscribers, musically well-versed in counterpoint, was again unsuccessful, with hardly thirty copies sold. Disappointed for the second time by the response, C.P.E. Bach sold the plates in 1756.

The initiative for publishing the four-part chorales of Bach was different. Possibly didactic in purpose, the four-part chorales were "miniature masterpieces of harmony and voice leading" with "searching harmonies and busy inner parts". The chorales were extracted from Bach's church music by the Berlin circle around C.P.E. Bach. Already in 1709, as a youth in the Arnstadt Consistory, Bach had been scolded for having "made many curious variatones in the chorale, and mingled many strange notes in it, and for the fact that the congregation has been confused by it". It is possible that Bach's reluctance to publish any four-part chorales was a consequence of such criticisms. At any rate, even fifteen years after Bach's death, the first editions of the four-part chorales also proved to be controversial and were not well-received, even amongst Bach devotees.

After 1750, Marpurg was the first to embark on preparing a published edition of Bach's four-part chorales during the Seven Years' War. Marpurg employed the Berlin publisher Friedrich Wilhelm Birnstiel, using manuscript copies dating from 1758. The project was aborted in 1763, because Marpurg was no longer available, having assumed responsibility for the Royal Prussian Lottery. The first part of the Birnstiel edition was later published in 1765, with C. P. E. Bach in the title page and preface. C. P. E. Bach was, however, dissatisfied with the second part of Birnstiel's 1769 edition. He broke off negotiations and surrendered the manuscript rights to Kirnberger in 1771. Despite Kirnberger's promises to publish Breitkopf's edition during the intervening period (1771–1777), no manuscripts materialised. Following a respectful pause to mark Kirnberger's death in 1783, C.P.E. Bach resumed discussion on the chorales with Breitkopf, with a positive outcome for the first instalment in July 1784. With no further reasons to delay printing, the first instalment began at the end of the year, followed by further annual instalments until the whole collection was completed in 1787. After two false starts in 1765 and 1769, a new chapter thus commenced in the history of Bach's impact, as his choral repertory became more extensively available.

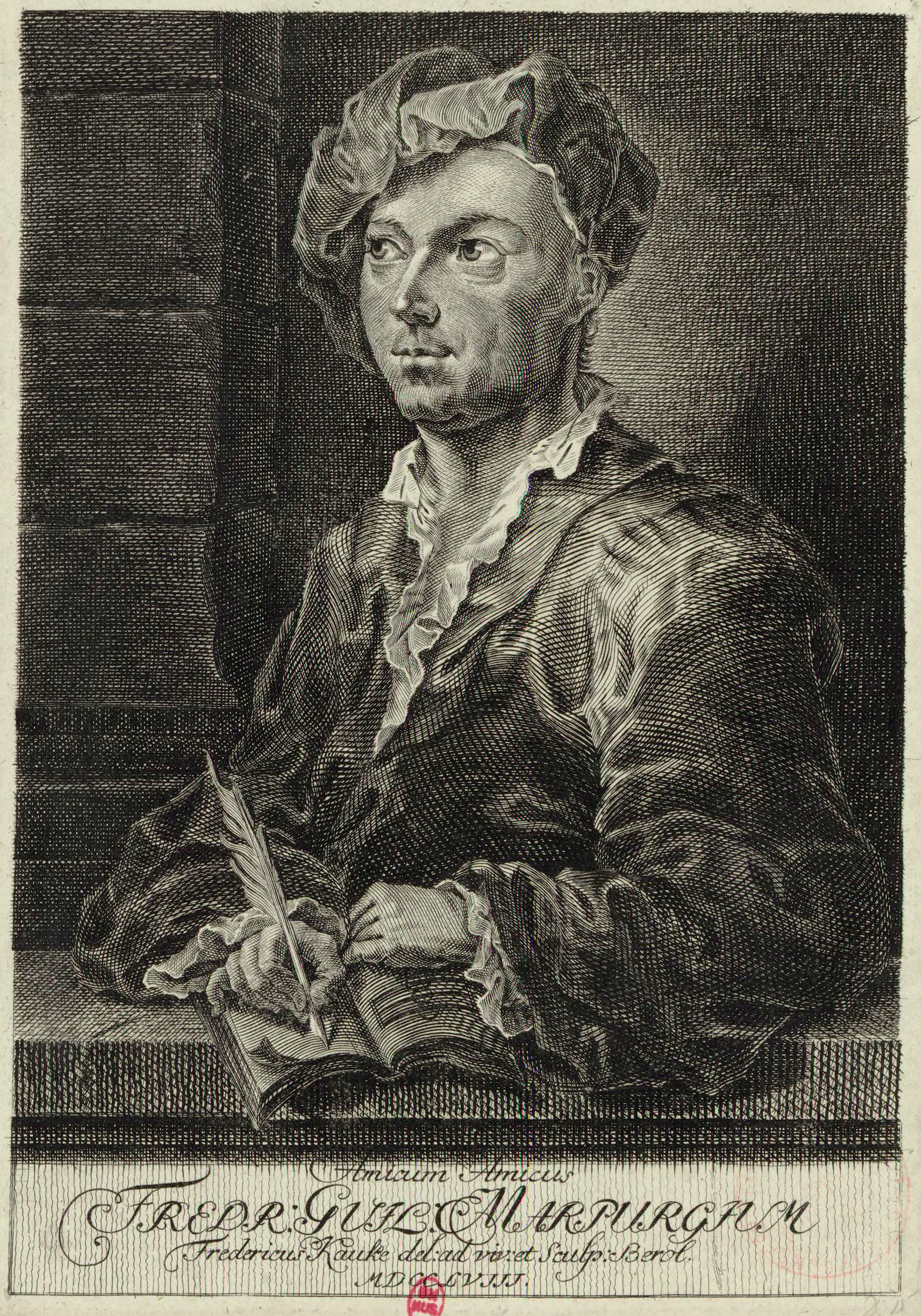
Engraving of F.W. Marpurg by Berol after a drawing by Kauke, 1758

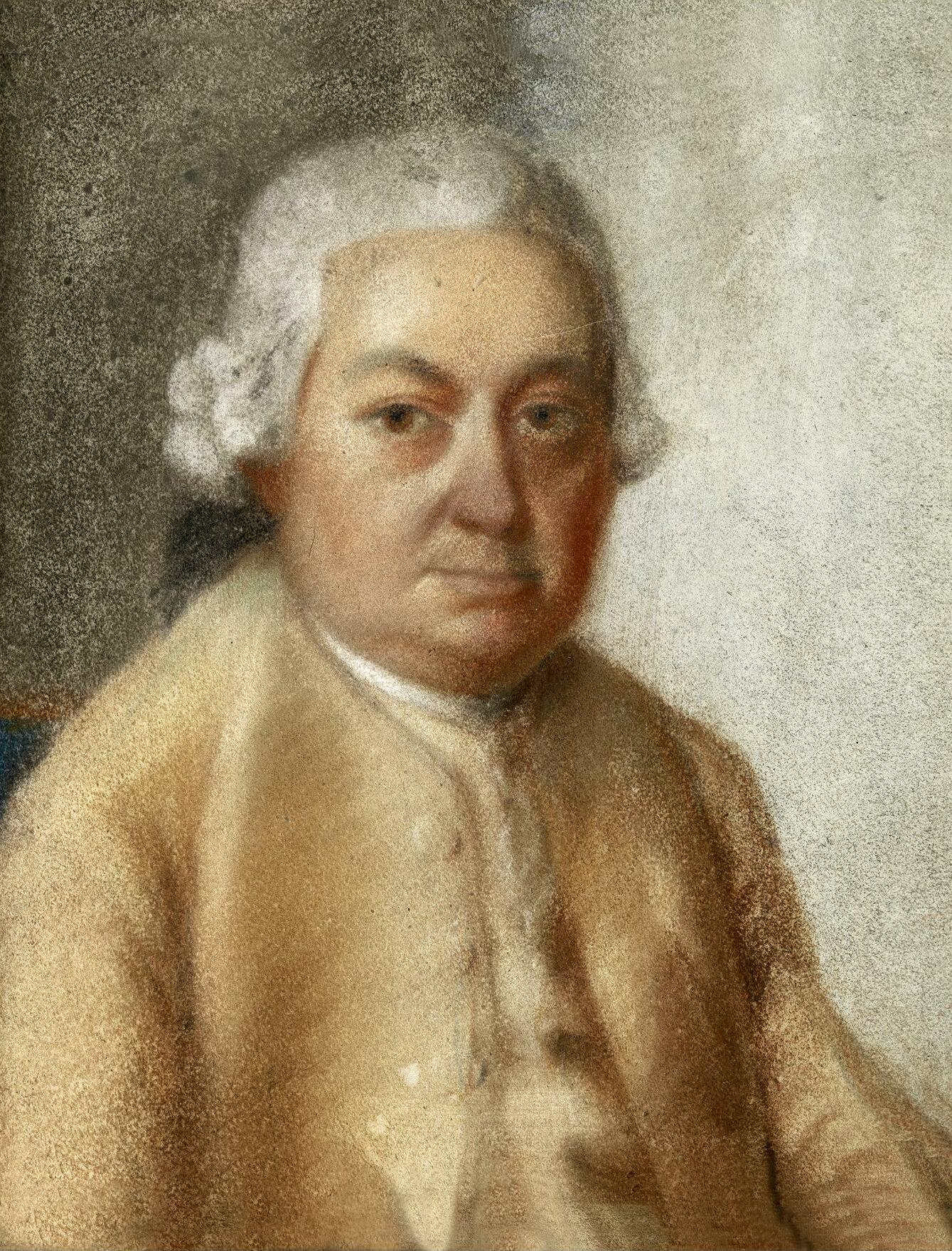
Pastel portrait of C.P.E. Bach, Hamburg, c 1780

Portrait of J.P. Kirnberger by C.F.R. Lisiewski, 1780

== Chorales published by Birnstiel ==
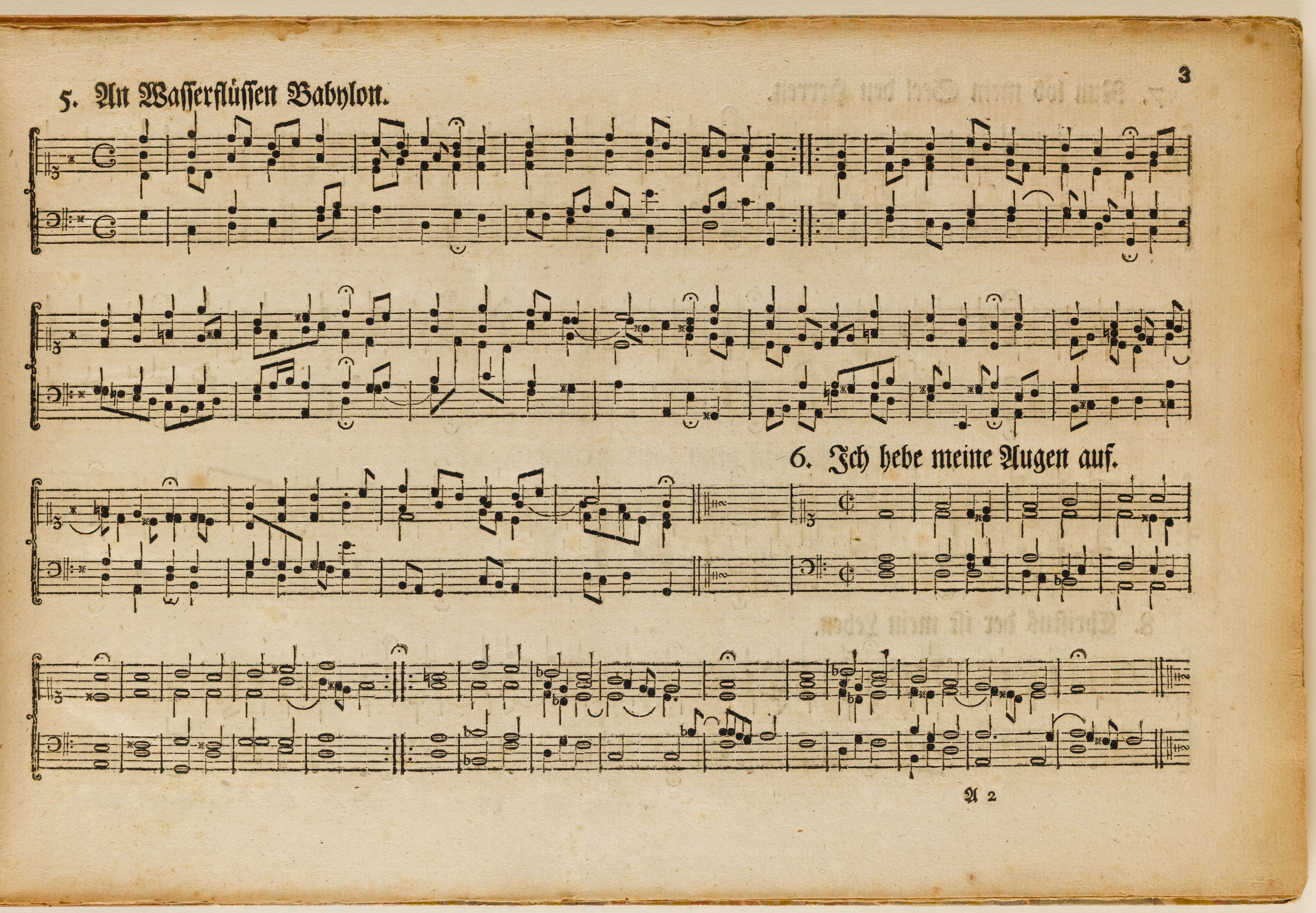
Birnstiel's first volume (1765), p. 3, containing BWV 267 by J. S. Bach and BWV Anh. 203 by D. Vetter.

In 1765 F. W. Birnstiel published 100 chorales in Berlin. The edition had been initiated by F. W. Marpurg and completed, edited and supplemented with a preface and a list of errata by C. P. E. Bach. A second volume of 100 was issued by the same publisher in 1769, edited by J. F. Agricola.

Birnstiel's first volume (1765): first half of C. P. E. Bach's Preface.

Birnstiel's first volume (1765): second half of C. P. E. Bach's Preface.

=== First volume (1765) ===
Daniel Vetter had published the second volume of his Musicalische Kirch- und Hauß-Ergötzlichkeit in 1713. A handful of its four-part chorale settings ended up in the first volume of Birnstiel's first volume of chorale settings by Bach. The sixth and last movement of Bach's chorale cantata Liebster Gott, wenn werd ich sterben? BWV 8 is a slightly reworked version of Vetter's four-part setting of the hymn with the same name, close enough to Vetter's original to be marked as spurious in the 1998 edition of the Bach-Werke-Verzeichnis.

Chorale settings by D. Vetter in Birnstiel's 1765 Volume
BWV	Birnstiel	Vetter	Title
8/6	47	91	Liebster Gott, wann werd ich sterben
Anh. 201	15	35	Du Friedefürst, Herr Jesu Christ
Anh. 202	31	29	Gott hat das Evangelium
Anh. 203	6	20	Ich hebe meine Augen auf
Anh. 204	18	5	O Traurigkeit, o Herzeleid

=== Second volume (1769) ===
C. P. E. Bach criticised Birnstiel's second volume as being full of mistakes in an article which was published in Hamburg in the Staats- und Gelehrte Zeitung des Hamburgischen unpartheyeschen Correspondenten on 30 May 1769, in which he also claimed that some of the chorale harmonisations included in the volume had not been composed by his father.

== Chorales published by Breitkopf ==
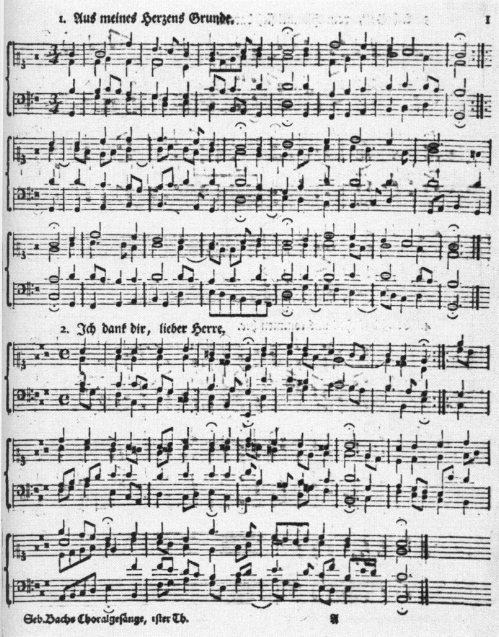
Breitkopf 1784: No. 1 "Aus meines Herzens Grunde" (= BWV 269) and No. 2 "Ich dank' dir, lieber Herre" (= BWV 347)

After Kirnberger died in 1783, C. P. E. Bach became Breitkopf's editor for the chorales, which he then published in four parts:

- Vol. I (1784): Nos. 1–96
- Vol. II (1785): Nos. 97–194
- Vol. III (1786): Nos. 195–283
- Vol. IV (1787): Nos. 283–370

Since the number 283 was used twice (last number of Vol. III and first number of Vol. IV), the collection actually contained 371 items. The collection also contained several doubles (e.g. No. 156 is identical to No. 307): it totalled 348 independent harmonisations.

== Reception: the Dietel manuscript ==
The Breitkopf collection went through four more editions and countless reprintings until 1897:

- The Breitkopf edition of 1832.
- The Breitkopf edition of 1898.

In addition there were other historic editions:

- The Friese edition of 1843.
- The Peters edition of 1850/1865.
- The Bach-Gesellschaft edition of 1892.
- The Oxford edition of 1929.
- The Peters edition of 1932.

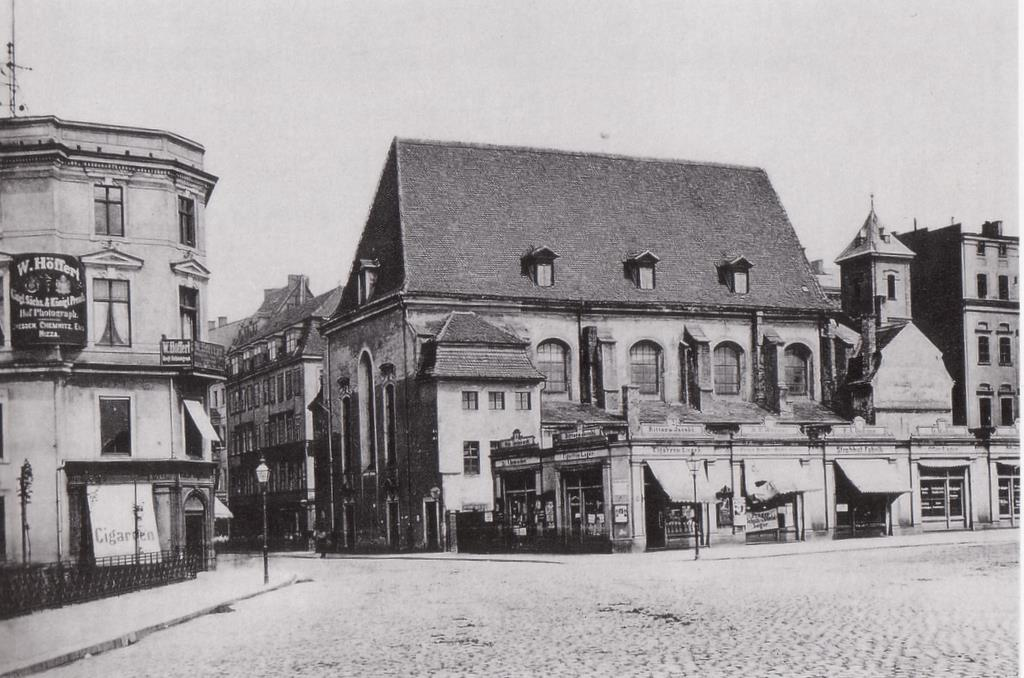
The Lutheran Alte Peterskirche, Leipzig in 1880

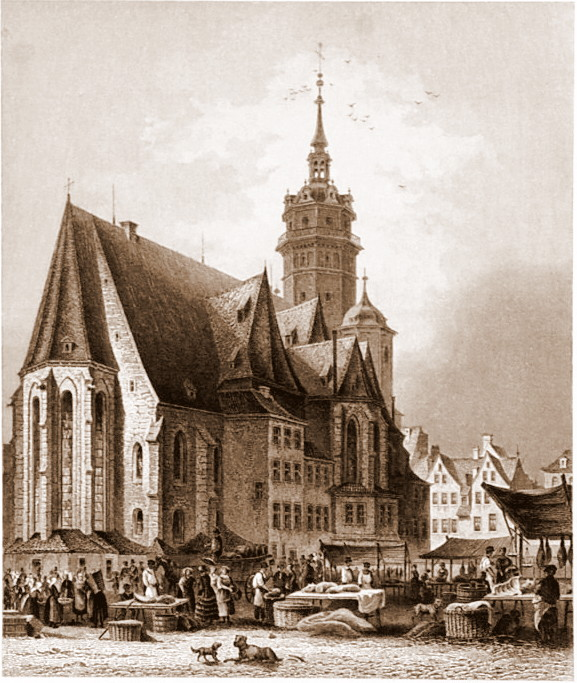
The Nikolaikirche, Leipzig in 1850

The new 1831 score was revised directly by Breitkopf, only afterwards approaching an expert to supply the preface and title. The choice of the Leipzig music collector Carl Ferdinand Becker followed a traditional route: a former chorister from the Thomanerschule, who was later appointed organist at the Alte Peterskirche in Leipzig. Becker subsequently seems to have regretted his decision. At that stage organist at the Leipzig Nikolaikirche, Becker's critical commentary was the first to discuss the manuscript sources prepared by Kirnberger and C. P. E. Bach, even if only in a general way.

Becker subsequently seems to have regretted his decision. A new edition for the four-part choral harmonisations was published in Leipzig by Robert Freise in three instalments, 1841–1843, without omitting Becker's own participation in the 1831 edition. At that stage organist at the Leipzig Nikolaikirche, Becker's critical commentary was the first to discuss the manuscript sources prepared by Kirnberger and C. P. E. Bach, even if only in a general way.

The task of preparing a detailed critical edition was first undertaken by Ludwig Erk, in his painstaking two-volume Peters edition of 1850 and 1865. His comparison of the original manuscripts and reliable copies with the 1831 Breitkopf edition was devastating, with many examples of errors. Franz Wüllner, however, the editor of the Bach-Gesellschaft responsible for the chorales, judged that Erk had gone too far in his criticism and had himself made mistakes. No serious faults were found in the 1784–1787 edition.

Erk's Peters edition was still available with a revised version in 1932 by Friedrich Smend, with which he was not entirely happy. It still competed for quality with the complete and practical Breitkopf edition with 389 pieces (Bernhard Friedrich Richter). Nevertheless, at that stage the most exact and scientifically useful edition was that of Charles Sanford Terry, Clarendon Press, in 1929.

Based on decades of familiarity with the sources of the four-part chorales, Smend, in his 1966 Bach-Jahrbuch, significantly advanced the scientific investigation of sources, which previously had been left in a precarious state following Philip Spitta's reported loss of manuscripts. Above all, in 1964 Peter Krause unearthed manuscript R 18 in the Musikbibliothek des Stadt Leipzig, the missing source for volumes III–IV of the 1784–1787 edition.

Despite the merits of Smend's commentary, however, it has been criticised because it does not quite tally with known evidence. The assumptions of Smend are evaluated in the technical editorial report [not discussed here]. Staying within the limited scope of this account, the complicated picture underlying Bach's Chorales can be outlined in a few strokes.

According to recent findings, neither Marpurg, C. P. E. Bach Emanuel or Kirnberger had priority to the principal collector of Bach's four-part chorales. Instead the honour fell to an alumnus of the Thomasschule zu Leipzig, unknown until the early 1960s, one of the choristers aimed at Bach's famous 1730 "Draft for a Well-Appointed Church Music" ("Entwurf einer wohlbestallten Kirchenmusik"). It was already known from Alfred Dürr to have been "Hauptkopist F", Bach's principal copyist in the first half of the 1730s, who for example performed in the Christmas Oratorio. In 1981 Andreas Glöckner identified the copyist as Johann Ludwig Dietel (1713-1777), who attended the Thomasschule from 1727 to 1735, matriculated at the University of Leipzig in 1736 and later became cantor in his home town of Falkenhain, north east of Leipzig.

The fact that manuscript "R 18" originated in this way is entirely conclusive: the special musical notation, the watermarks, the repertoire from the Christmas Oratorio and the exact dating of one of the last chorales to be copied—the final movement of cantata "Was Gott micht mit die Zeit" (BWV 14), composed for 30 January 1735, that appeared as entry CXXIX in the manuscript.

== Sources ==
- "Liebster Gott, wenn werd ich sterben [1st version] BWV 8.1". Bach Digital. Leipzig: Bach Archive; et al. 2020-04-08.
- "Liebster Gott, wenn werd ich sterben BWV 8/6". Bach Digital. Leipzig: Bach Archive; et al. 2019-05-22.
- David, Hans Theodore; Mendel, Arthur; Wolff, Christoph (1999). The New Bach Reader: A Life of Johann Sebastian Bach in Letters and Documents. W.W. Norton. ISBN 9780393319569.
- Dirst, Matthew (2012). "Inventing the Bach chorale". Engaging Bach: The Keyboard Legacy from Marpurg to Mendelssohn. Musical Performance and Reception. Cambridge University Press. pp. 34–54. ISBN 978-0521651608.
- Dirst, Matthew (2017). "Early Posthumous Published Editions". In Leaver, Robin A. (ed.). The Routledge Research Companion to Johann Sebastian Bach. Taylor & Francis. pp. 464–474. ISBN 9781409417903.
- Dürr, Alfred; Kobayashi, Yoshitake, eds. (1998). Bach Werke Verzeichnis: Kleine Ausgabe – Nach der von Wolfgang Schmieder vorgelegten 2. Ausgabe [Bach Works Catalogue: Small Edition – After Wolfgang Schmieder's 2nd edition] (in German). Kirsten Beißwenger (collaborator). (BWV^{2a} ed.). Wiesbaden: Breitkopf & Härtel. ISBN 9783765102493. Preface in English and German.
- Jerold, Beverly (2012). "Johann Philipp Kirnberger versus Friedrich Wilhelm Marpurg: A Reappraisal" (PDF). Dutch Journal of Music Theory: 91–108.
- Jerold, Beverly (2013). "Johann Philipp Kirnberger and Authorship". Notes. 69 (4). Music Library Association: 688–705. doi:10.1353/not.2013.0064. S2CID 162055740.
- Jerold, Beverly (2014). "Johann Philipp Kirnberger and the Bach Chorale Settings". Bach. 45 (1). Riemenschneider Bach Institute: 34–43. JSTOR 43489889.
- Jones, Richard Douglas (2007), The Creative Development of Johann Sebastian Bach: Music to Delight the Spirit, Volume 1: 1695–1717, Oxford University Press, ISBN 978-0-19-816440-1
- Platen, Emil [in German] (1976). "Zur Echtheit einiger Choralsätze Johann Sebastian Bachs" [On the authenticity of some of Johann Sebastian Bach's chorale settings]. In Schulze, Hans-Joachim; Wolff, Christoph (eds.). Bach-Jahrbuch 1975 [Bach Yearbook 1975]. Bach-Jahrbuch (in German). Vol. 61. Neue Bachgesellschaft. Berlin: Evangelische Verlagsanstalt. pp. 50–62. doi:10.13141/bjb.v1975.
- Schulze, Hans-Joachim (1983). ""150 Stücke von den Bachischen Erben": Zur Überlieferung der vierstimmigen Choräle Johann Sebastian Bachs" ["150 pieces from the Bach estate": on the transmission of Johann Sebastian Bach's four-part chorales]. In Schulze, Hans-Joachim; Wolff, Christoph (eds.). Bach-Jahrbuch 1983 [Bach Yearbook 1983]. Bach-Jahrbuch (in German). Vol. 69. Neue Bachgesellschaft. Berlin: Evangelische Verlagsanstalt. pp. 81–100. doi:10.13141/bjb.v1983. ISSN 0084-7682.
- Schulze, Hans-Joachim (1996). "J.S. Bach's Vocal Works in the Breitkopf Nonthematic Catalogs of 1761 to 1836". In George B. Stauffer (ed.). J.S. Bach, the Breitkopfs, and Eighteenth-century Music Trade. Bach Perspectives. Vol. 2. University of Nebraska Press. pp. 35–52. ISBN 0803210442.
- Smend, Friedrich [in German] (1966). "Zu den ältesten Sammlungen der vierstimmigen Choräle J. S. Bachs" [Regarding the eldest collections of J. S. Bach's four-part chorales]. In Dürr, Alfred; Neumann, Werner (eds.). Bach-Jahrbuch 1966 [Bach Yearbook 1966]. Bach-Jahrbuch (in German). Vol. 52. Neue Bachgesellschaft. Berlin: Evangelische Verlagsanstalt. pp. 5–40. doi:10.13141/bjb.v1966.
- Spitta, Philipp (1899). Johann Sebastian Bach: His Work and Influence on the Music of Germany, 1685–1750. Translated by Bell, Clara; Fuller Maitland, John Alexander. Novello & Co.
  - Volume I
  - Volume II
  - Volume III
- Vetter, Daniel (1713). Musicalische Kirch- und Hauß-Ergötzlichkeit (in German). Vol. 2. Leipzig. OCLC 857536916.
- Wachowski, Gerd [in German] (1983). "Die vierstimmigen Choräle Johann Sebastian Bachs: Untersuchungen zu den Druckausgaben von 1765 bis 1932 und zur Frage der Authentizität" [The four-part chorales of Johann Sebastian Bach: research into the printed editions from 1765 to 1732 and regarding the question of authenticity]. In Schulze, Hans-Joachim; Wolff, Christoph (eds.). Bach-Jahrbuch 1983 [Bach Yearbook 1983]. Bach-Jahrbuch (in German). Vol. 69. Neue Bachgesellschaft. Berlin: Evangelische Verlagsanstalt. pp. 51–79. doi:10.13141/bjb.v1983. ISSN 0084-7682.
