= Liebster Gott, wann werd ich sterben =

17th-century German Christian hymn

- Christian hymn
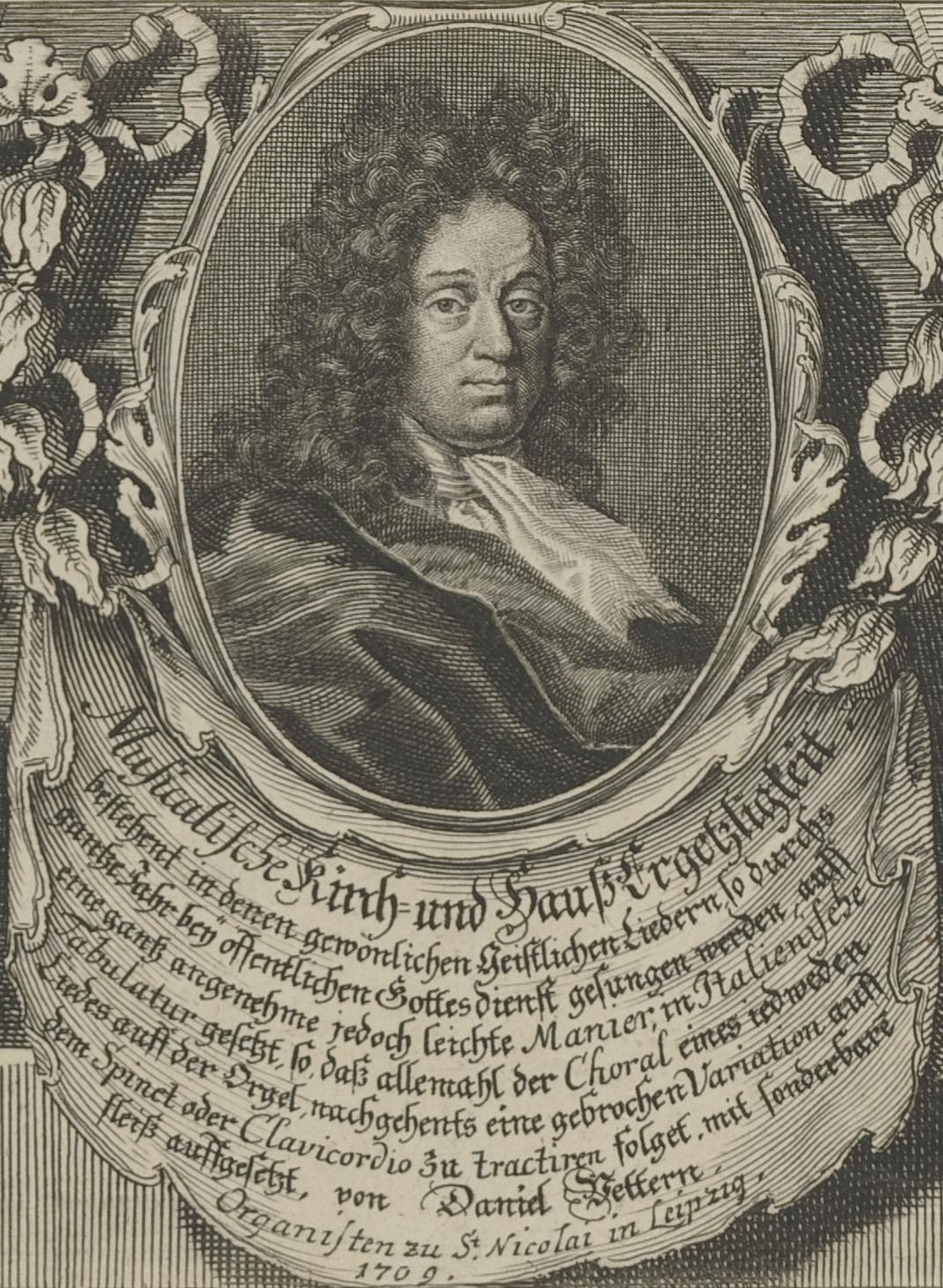
- Daniel Vetter, the composer
- Related: Bach's Liebster Gott, wann werd ich sterben, BWV 8
- Written: c. 1690
- Text: by Caspar Neumann
- Language: German
- Melody: by Daniel Vetter
- Published: 1713

"Liebster Gott, wann werd ich sterben" (Note: Spelling variants: Lieber (lit. 'Dear') instead of Liebster.; No comma after Gott; or, an exclamation mark instead of that comma.; wenn instead of wann.; werd' or wird instead of werd.; Title ending on a question mark.; Variants also include differences in capitalisation, e.g. GOTT instead of Gott.) ("Dearest God, when will I die") (Note: Other translations include: "Ah, Lord God, when shall I see Thee?"; "Dearest God, when wilt Thou call me?"; "Gracious God, when wilt Thou call me?"; "Dearest God, when shall I die?"; "Dearest God, when will my death be?"; "O my God, when shall I perish?") is a Lutheran hymn which Caspar Neumann, an evangelical theologian from Breslau, wrote around 1690. The topic of the hymn, which has five stanzas of eight lines, is a reflection on death. An elaborate analysis of the hymn's content was published in 1749. A few text variants of the hymn originated in the 18th century. Neumann's text is usually sung to the hymn tune of "Freu dich sehr o meine Seele".

Daniel Vetter, a native of Breslau, set the hymn in the first half of the 1690s, and published this setting in a version for SATB singers in 1713. This setting was picked up by Johann Sebastian Bach, who based some of his compositions on it. His chorale cantata based on Neumann's hymn, Liebster Gott, wenn werd ich sterben, BWV 8, was first performed in Leipzig in 1724, Vetter's hymn tune, Zahn No. 6634, appearing in its outer movements.

The closing chorale of BWV 8 is a reworked version of Vetter's four-part setting. The appreciation of the similarity (or: difference) between this cantata movement, BWV 8/6, and Vetter's original ranges from "somewhat altered" to "with radical alterations", the 1998 edition of the Bach-Werke-Verzeichnis listing the 1724 version as a composition by Vetter. Another setting of Neumann's hymn was published in 1747.

== Text ==
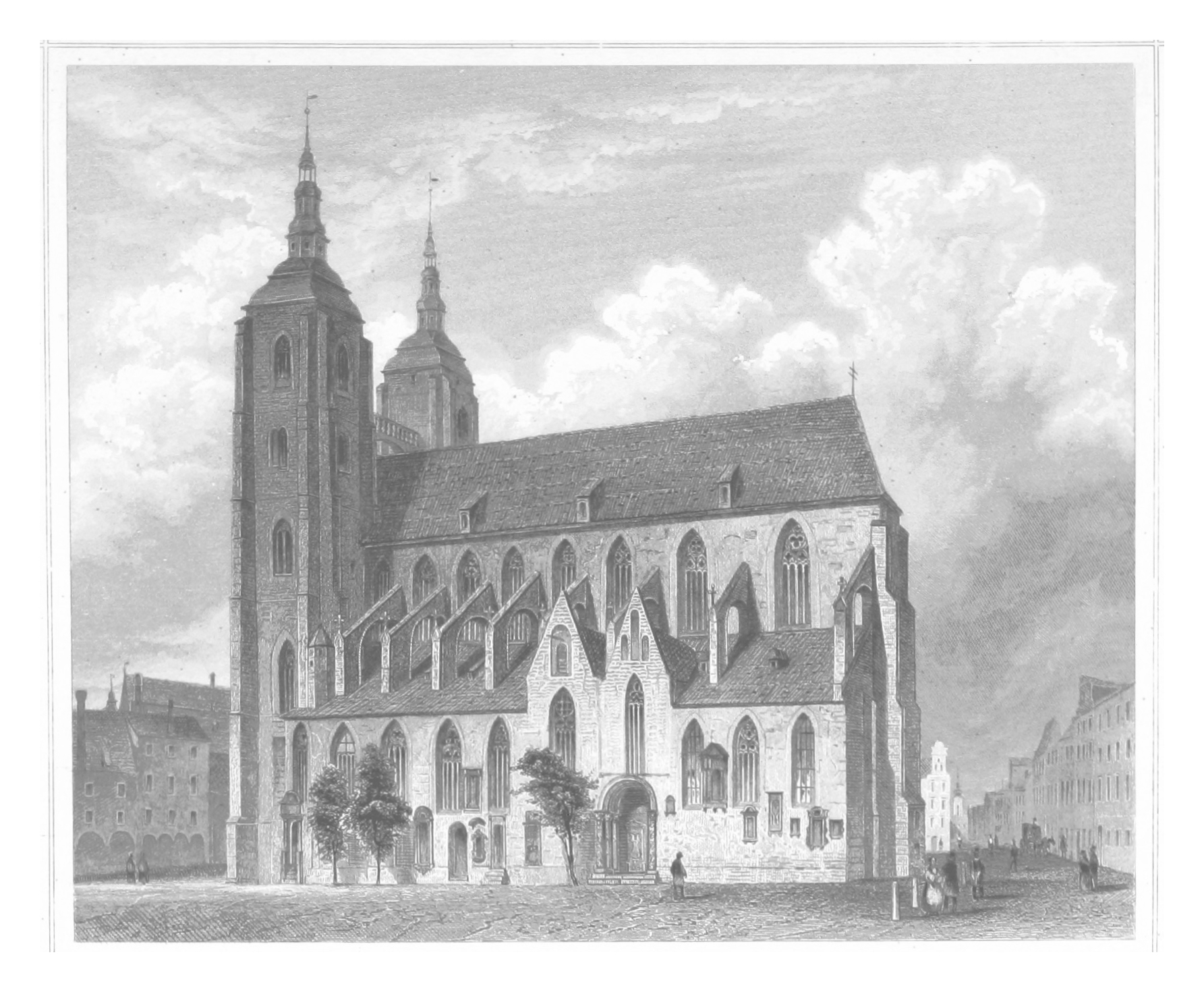
St Mary Magdalene Church in Breslau (19th-century drawing)

Neumann was born in Breslau (now Wrocław in Poland, then in German Silesia) in 1648. From 1667 to 1670 he studied in Jena. Less than a year after having been assigned court preacher in Altenburg in 1678, he returned to his native town, where he became pastor at the St Mary Magdalene Church in 1689. He wrote "Liebster Gott, wann werd ich sterben" around 1690. It is a Lutheran hymn in five stanzas of eight lines. Its hymn metre is 8.7.8.7.7.7.8.8. The topic of the hymn text is a reflection on death. Gabriel Wimmer's extensive commentary on the hymn was published in 1749.

=== Content ===
In what follows, the German text of Neumann's hymn is according to Wimmer's publication, and the English translation of the hymn, where provided, is according to Charles Sanford Terry's 1917 publication on hymns as included in Bach's cantatas and motets: these verse translations are John Troutbeck's as published by Novello. The explanatory notes, comparing the hymn text to bible passages, are a translation of Wimmer's, based on KJV for bible quotes.

First stanza

Liebster GOtt, wenn werd ich sterben? (Note: Ecclesiastes 9:5: "the living know that they shall die"; Ecclesiastes 9:12: "man also knoweth not his time"; Job 14:5)
Meine Zeit läuft immer hin, (Note: Psalms 144:4: "his days are as a shadow that passeth away"; Job 7:6)
und des alten Adams Erben, (Note: Genesis 5:3: "Adam ... begat a son in his own likeness")
unter denen ich auch bin, (Note: Wisdom of Solomon 7:1: "I myself also am a mortal man, like to all"; Acts 14:13)
haben diß zum Vater-Theil, (Note: 1 Corinthians 15:22: "For as in Adam all die, (etc)")
daß sie eine kleine Weil (Note: 1 Peter 5:10: "ye have suffered a while"; 1 Peter 1:6)
arm und elend sein auf Erden,
und denn selber Erde werden. (Note: Wisdom of Sirach 40:1–2: "a heavy yoke is ... / ... the day of death"; 2 Samuel 14:14; Job 30:23)

Translation:

When will God recall my spirit?
Lives of men run swiftly by;
All who Adam's frame inherit,
One among his heirs am I,
Know that this befalls the race,
They but for a little space
Dwell on earth in want and mourning,
Soon to earth themselves returning.

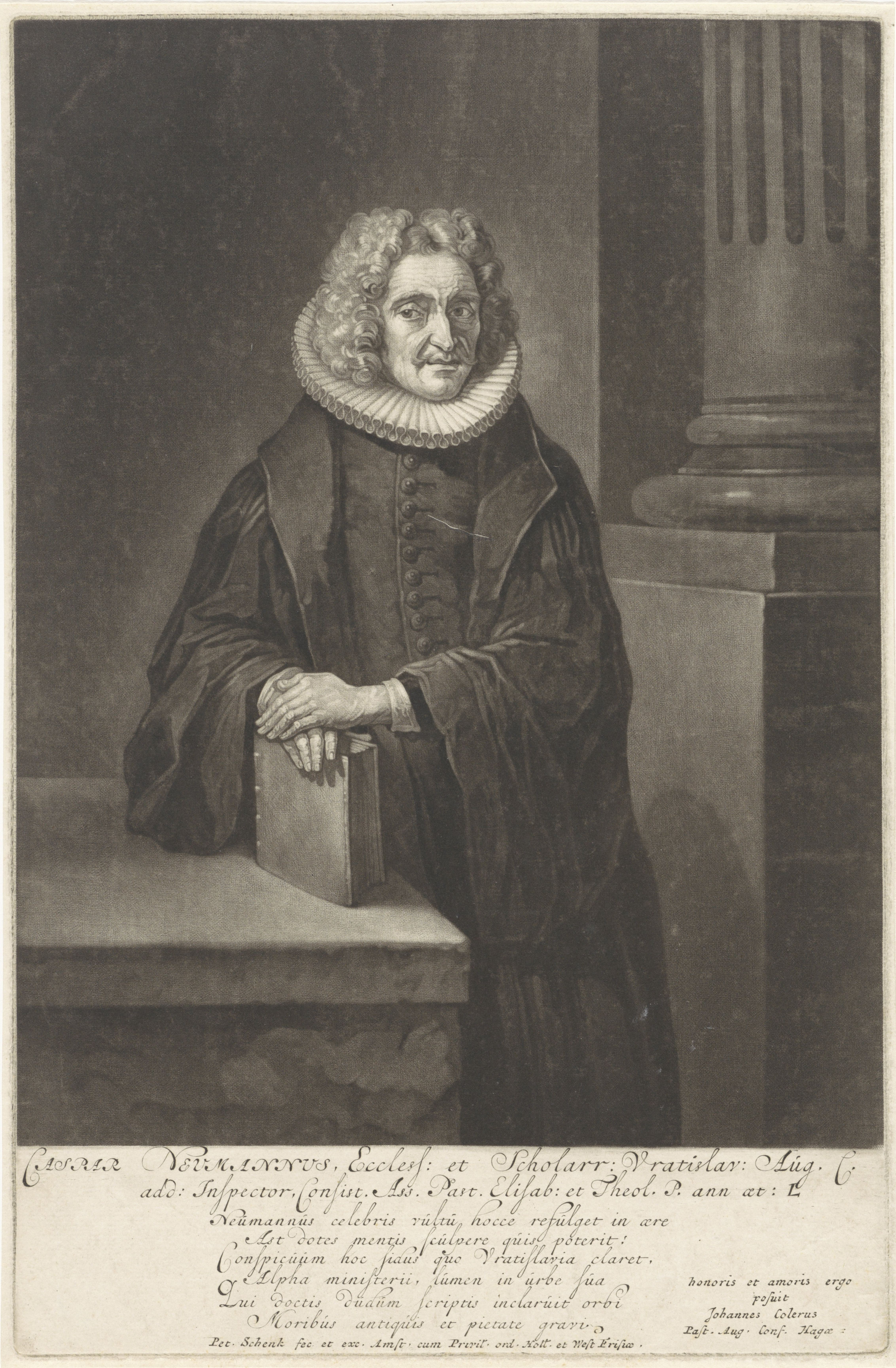
Caspar Neumann

Second stanza

Zwar ich will mich gar nicht widern (Note: Acts 25:11: "I refuse not to die"; Acts 20:24; Genesis 46:30; 1 Kings 19:4)
zu beschliessen meine Zeit
trag ich doch in allen Gliedern
Saamen von der Sterblichkeit, (Note: Romans 8:10: "the body is dead because of sin"; Job 17:14)
muß doch immer da und dort
einer nach den andern fort, (Note: Wisdom of Sirach 38:22: "yesterday for me, and to day for thee"; Joshua 23:14; 2 Samuel 14:14)
und schon mancher liegt im Grabe
den ich wohl gekennet habe. (Note: John 11:11: "Our friend Lazarus sleepeth"; Matthew 2:20)

Translation:

Third stanza

Aber, GOtt, was werd ich dencken, (Note: Jonah 2:4: "Then I said, I am cast out of thy sight")
wenn es wird ans sterben gehn? (Note: Wisdom of Sirach 7:36: "remember the end, and (etc)"; Wisdom of Sirach 14:12)
Wo wird man den Leib versencken? (Note: Genesis 47:29f: "bury me not, I pray thee, in Egypt: But I will lie with my fathers")
Wie wirds um die Seele stehn? (Note: Luke 12:20: "this night thy soul shall be required of thee"; Isaiah 38:15)
Ach! Was Kummer fällt mir ein:
Wessen wird mein Vorrath sein! (Note: Luke 12:20: "whose shall those things be, which thou hast provided?"; Psalms 39:7; Lamentations 5:2)
Und wo werden meine Lieben
nach einander sich verstieben? (Note: Acts 11:19: "they ... were scattered abroad upon the persecution that arose"; Matthew 26:31)

Translation:

Fourth stanza

Doch was darf es dieser Sorgen? (Note: Philippians 4:5–6: "The Lord is at hand. Be careful for nothing"; 1 Peter 5:7)
Soll ich nicht zu JEsu gehn? (Note: 2 Corinthians 5:8: "We are confident, I say, and willing rather to be absent from the body, and to be present with the Lord"; Luke 23:43; Philippians 1:23; 1 Thessalonians 4:17)
Lieber heute noch als morgen,
denn mein Fleisch wird auferstehn; (Note: Job 19:25: "I know that my redeemer (etc)"; 1 Corinthians 15:44)
ich verzeih es gern der Welt,
daß sie allen Schein behält, (Note: Philippians 3:13: "forgetting those things which are behind")
und bescheide meinen Erben
einen GOtt, (Note: Joshua 13:33: "the LORD God of Israel was their inheritance") der nicht kan sterben. (Note: 1 Timothy 6:16: "Who only hath immortality")

Translation:

Fifth stanza

Herrscher uber Tod und Leben, (Note: Romans 14:9: "For to this end Christ both died, and rose, and revived, that he might be Lord both of the dead and living"; Psalms 8:2; Psalms 103:19)
mach einmal mein Ende gut; (Note: 1 Corinthians 1:8: "Who shall ... confirm you unto the end"; 1 Peter 1:9)
Lehre mich den Geist aufgeben
mit recht wohlgefasstem Muth, (Note: Acts 7:59–60: "Lord Jesus, receive my spirit ... And when he had said this (etc)"; Luke 2:29; 2 Maccabees 6:27f; Hebrews 12:3)
hilf, dass ich ein ehrlich Grab
neben frommen Christen hab, (Note: Tobit 4:4: "bury her by me"; Tobit 14:12; Genesis 49:29)
und auch endlich in der Erde
nimmermehr zu Schanden werde. (Note: Psalms 71:1: "In thee, O LORD, do I put my trust: let me never be put to confusion"; Psalms 31:1)

Translation:

Thou that life and death ordainest,
Make it mine in peace to die;
Let me yield the soul Thou trainest,
With a courage calm and high.
Grant that I an honoured grave
With the holy dead may have,
Earthly grief and toil forsaking,
Nevermore to shame awaking.

Another linking of phrases from the hymn, and paraphrases thereof, to biblical passages can be found in Melvin P. Unger's 1996 book with interlinear translations of Bach's cantata texts.

=== Adaptations ===
Copies of the 1720 and 1721 prints of Franz Anton von Sporck's Verschiedene Buß-Gedancken Einer Reumüthigen Seele, Uber Die Sterblichkeit deß Menschens are extant. The publication contains "O Gott! mein Zeit laufft immer hin", which is an adaptation of Neumann's hymn. Like the original, it has five stanzas of eight lines.

The text of the four middle movements of BWV 8 is an expanded paraphrase of stanzas two to four of Neumann's hymn. The second and third stanza of the hymn form the basis of the second and third movement of the cantata, which are an aria followed by a recitative. The text of the next two movements of the cantata, again an aria followed by a recitative, draws from, and expands upon, the hymn's fourth stanza.

In 1789, Benjamin Friedrich Schmieder published Hymnologie, oder, Ueber Tugenden und Fehler der verschiedenen Arten geistlicher Lieder, in which he presented an improved version of Neumann's hymn. Schmieder clarifies the improvements he proposes in accompanying prose. The incipit of this version reads: "Ach wie bald, Herr, kan ich sterben!" (lit. 'Ah how soon, Lord, can I die!').

== Melodies and settings ==
Freu dich sehr, o meine Seele

Shortly after Neumann's death, in 1715, his collected prayers and hymns were published in Breslau, under the title Kern Aller Gebete und Gesänge. The publication mentions two possible pre-existing hymn tunes for "Liebster Gott, wann werd ich sterben":

- "Freu dich sehr o meine Seele"
- "Werde munter, mein Gemüte"

The second, Zahn No. 6551, was composed by Johann Schop and published in 1642. The first, Zahn No. 6543, EG 524, became the common melody for Neumann's hymn. This tune was originally published for a French (1551), and later a German (1587), version of Psalm 42 ("As the hart panteth after the water brooks"), before it was used for the "Freu dich sehr o meine Seele" hymn in the early 17th century, with which it was later generally associated. This melody is also known as GENEVAN 42, referring to its first publication, as "Wie nach einer Wasserquelle", referring to the German version of Psalm 42, and as "Abermal ein Jahr verflossen", referring to another hymn sung to the same tune. (Note: For the "Abermal ein Jahr verflossen" name variant, see, e.g., Vollständiges Hessen-Hanauisches Choralbuch (1754), where the Register indicates No. 578, that is the "Freu dich sehr o meine Seele" melody, as tune for "Abermal ein Jahr verflossen".) Bach adopted this melody with various texts (none of these, however, from Neumann's hymn) in his cantatas BWV 13, 19, 25, 30, 32, 39, 70 and 194. Hymnals which contain the text of Neumann's hymn and indicate the Zahn 6543 melody as its tune include:

- Das Privilegirte Ordentliche und Vermehrte Dreßdnische Gesang-Buch, No. 623 in editions of 1730, 1759 and 1768
- Sammlung von geist- und trostreichen Sterb- und Begräbniß-Liedern (1747), No. 62
- Neues vollständiges Gesang-Buch, für die Königlich-Preußische, auch Churfürstlich-Brandenburgische und andere Lande, No. 623 in editions of 1748 and 1757
- Neu-eingerichtetes Kirchen- und Haus- Gesang-Buch (1749), No. 1007
- Allgemeines und vollständiges Evangelisches Gesangbuch für die Königl. Preuß. Schles. Lande (1751), No. 1046
- Seelen erquickendes Harpffen-Spiel (1764), No. 571
- Pommerscher Sing- Bet- Lob- und Danck-Altar, oder vollständiges Gesang-Buch (1776), No. 763
- Liedersammlung zum Gebrauch für Kranke und Sterbende (1789), No. 58
- Ein Unpartheyisches Gesang-Buch, No. 366 in editions of 1804, 1808 and 1829
- Die Kleine Geistliche Harfe der Kinder Zions, No. 299 in editions of 1811 and 1834
- Erbauliche Lieder-Sammlung (1826), No. 581
- Die Gemeinschaftliche Liedersammlung, No. 185 in editions of 1841 and 1849
- Hamburgisches Gesangbuch (1842), No. 638

=== Vetter's setting ===
Vetter, a native of Breslau, published his four-part setting of Neumann's hymn in 1713, in the second volume of his Musicalische Kirch- und Hauß-Ergötzlichkeit. In the introduction of that publication he wrote:

Da nun (...) die Sterbens-Lieder nothwendig hinzu gefüget werden müßten / so ist es nicht weniger durch die Erfahrung beglaubiget / wie erbaulich auf diese Weise die Todes-Gedancken glaübiger Herzen unterhalten werden können. (...) Dergleichen löbwurdige Sterbens-Gedancken hat auch / bey gesunden tagen / der Geistreiche und wegen des / bey allen andächtigen Betern sehr beliebten Büchleins / Kern aller Gebete genannt / besonders wohlbekannte Theologus und Prediger in Breßlau / Herr Mag. Caspar Neumann / in dem schönen Liede: Liebster Gott wenn werd ich sterben &c Mit poetischer Feder entworffen: Dessen Composition mir Herr Jacobus Wilisius, Breßlauischer Cantor zu St. Bernhardi ehemals aufgetragen / immassen derselbe solches bey seiner Beerdigung abzusingen verordnet hatte / wie auch nachgehends Anno 1695. würcklich geschehen / mittlerzeit aber ist dieses Lied / durch so viel Verstimmelung sehr unkäntlich worden / dannenhero ich vor nöthig befunden / demselben seine vorige Gestalt wiederumb zu geben / und vielen andächtigen Gemüthern hier an diesem Orte zu Liebe / welche bey glückseligem zustande zugleich ihres Todes offters ingedenck zu seyn nicht ermangeln / diesem Wercke beyzufügen / auch einen langsamen Tact, so viel nur möglich / dabey zu recommandiren.

— Daniel Vetter (Leipzig, 24 April 1713)
Translation:

While (...) necessarily hymns about death had to be added, it is thus no less confirmed by experience, how faithful hearts can, in this manner, entertain uplifting thoughts about death. (...) Such kind of commendable thoughts about dying, were, when in good health, designed with a poetic pen in the beautiful hymn "Dearest God when will I die" by the inspired theologian and preacher from Breslau, Master Caspar Neumann, who is particularly well-known because of the booklet named Core of all Prayers—which is much loved by all who engage in devout prayer. Jacob Wilisius, at the time cantor of St. Bernard in Breslau, commissioned me to set this hymn, and then ordered this to be sung at his funeral: this eventually happened in 1695. In the meanwhile, the hymn's setting has become unrecognisable by much mutilation, thus I found it necessary to restore its erstwhile form, and present this work, for which I also recommend as much as possible a slow tempo, here for the benefit of many devout souls, who even in a state of bliss don't fail to often ponder their death.

— translation
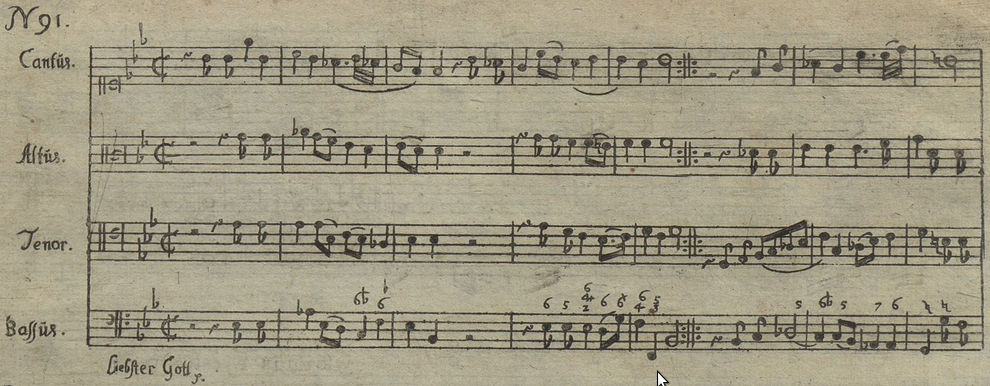
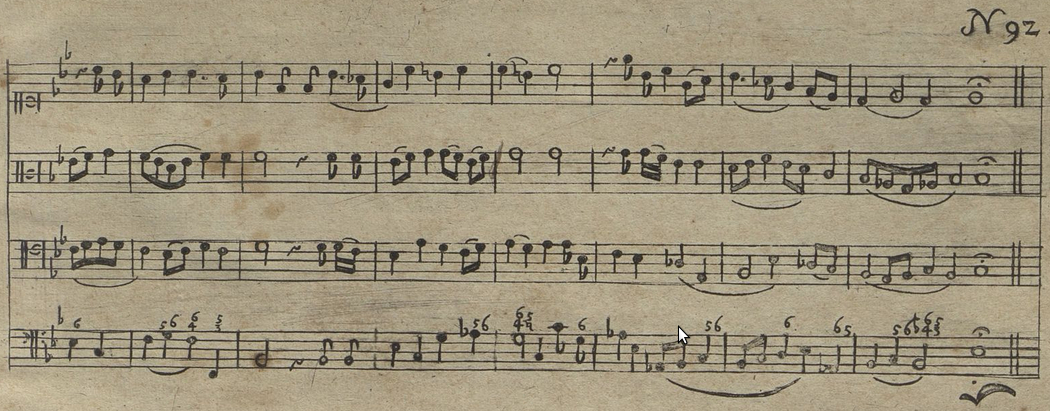
Both pages of Vetter's 1713 publication of his setting of Neumann's hymn

By the time Vetter wrote this, he had been an organist in Leipzig for around 35 years. Carl von Winterfeld quoted Vetter's 1713 introduction on the history of the origin of his setting. Later in the 19th century, Philipp Spitta, Johannes Zahn and Max Seiffert retold Vetter's account of the origin of his setting, as did Charles Sanford Terry in the early 20th century.

Vetter's SATB setting, which has a figured bass, is in E♭ major. It is in bar form, with the stollen comprising two lines of text. Its character is rather that of a sacred aria than that of a (church) song or chorale. The soprano's melody of Vetter's setting is a hymn tune known as Zahn No. 6634:

This expressive melody is Pietist, as opposed to the hymn tunes customary in Orthodox Lutheranism. By the late 18th century, Vetter's setting of Neumann's hymn was hardly remembered.

=== Compositions based on Vetter's setting ===
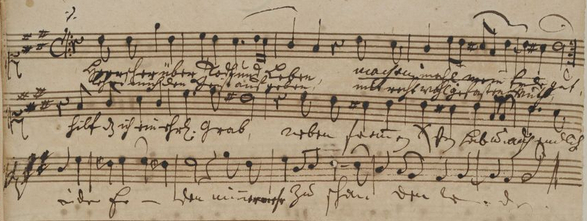
Last stanza of Neumann's hymn set to the Zahn 6634 melody in the soprano part of BWV 8/6: manuscript used for the première of Bach's chorale cantata in 1724.

There was a copy of the 1713 volume of Vetter's Musicalische Kirch- und Hauß-Ergötzlichkeit in the household of Johann Sebastian and Anna Magdalena Bach. Johann Sebastian composed the first version of his BWV 8 cantata in 1724. It is a cantata for the 16th Sunday after Trinity which is part of his second cantata cycle. Its first movement, setting the first stanza of the hymn, is a chorale fantasia on a modified form of Vetter's hymn tune. Its last movement, in E major like the first, is a reworked version of Vetter's four-part setting, for SATB choir, colla parte instruments and figured bass, with the last stanza of Neumann's hymn as text. By around 1735 the vocal parts of this movement, BWV 8/6, were adopted in the Dietel manuscript.

The final movement in the setting adopted from Vetter's reads:

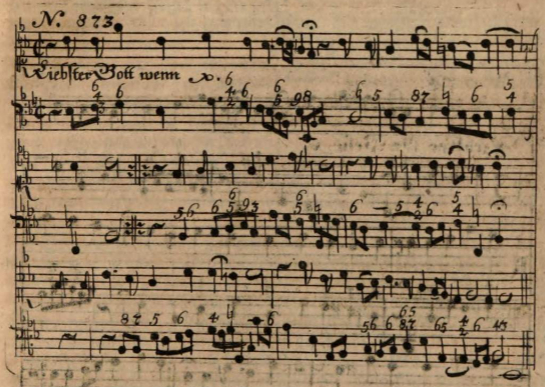
BWV 483 in Schemellis Gesangbuch

The Dietel manuscript also contains a four-part setting in E♭ major, BWV deest, of Vetter's hymn tune. In 1736, a voice and continuo arrangement of Vetter's hymn tune, attributed to Bach (BWV 483), in the same key, was included in Schemellis Gesangbuch. In 1747 Bach produced a second version of his BWV 8 cantata: its outer movements are D major transpositions of the same movements of the earlier version of the cantata.

When Bach's pupil Johann Friedrich Doles had become Thomaskantor some years after the composer's death, the BWV 8 cantata was performed again in Leipzig. According to the American musicologist David Yearsley, the widowed Anna Magdalena may have heard such performance, finding consolation in the hymn's text and setting. Friedrich Wilhelm Birnstiel published the four-part setting of the closing chorale of Bach's cantata in 1765. The same also appeared in the first volume of Breitkopf's edition of Bach's four-part chorales (1784), edited by Carl Philipp Emanuel Bach.

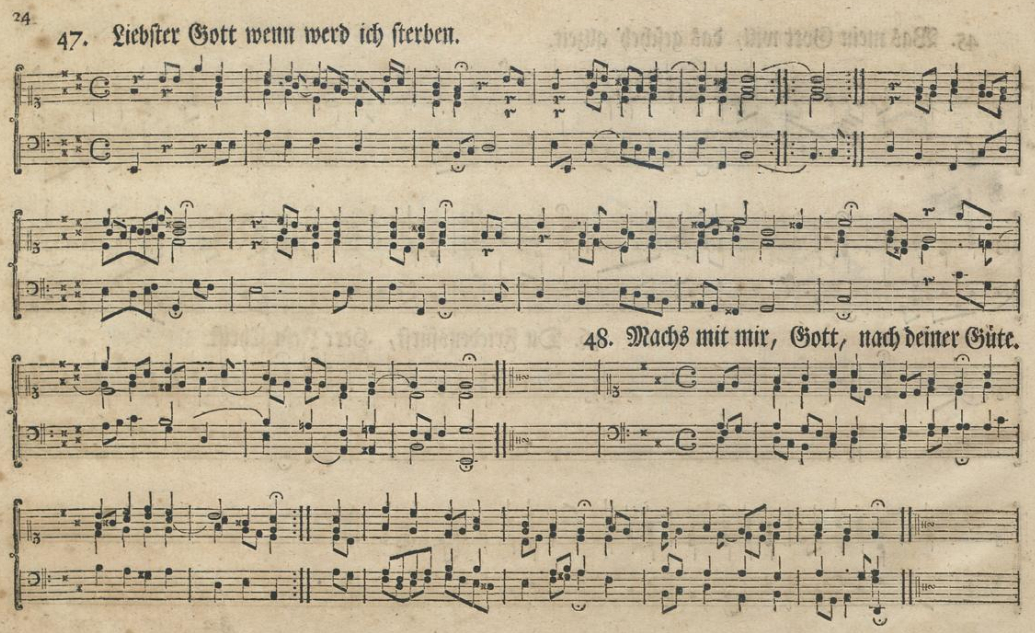
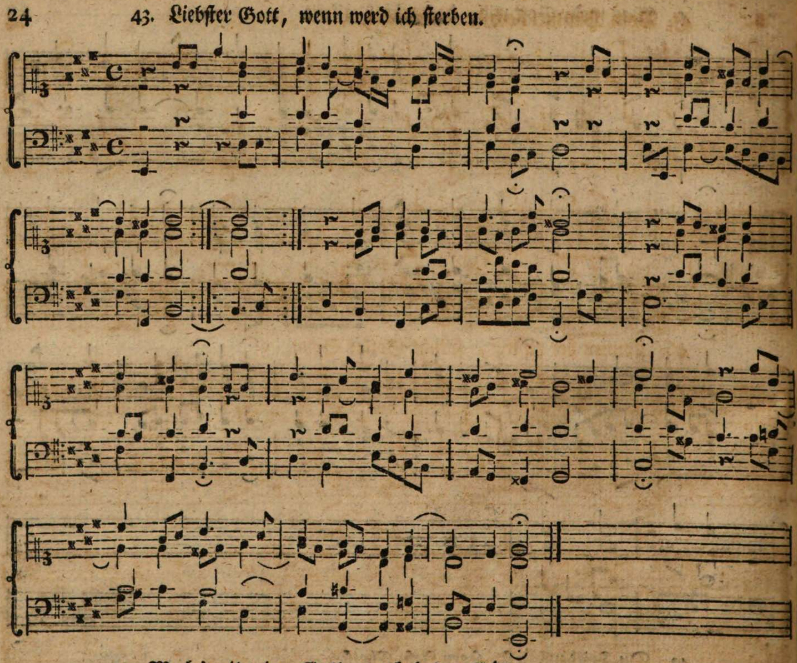
Left: first volume of Birnstiel's publications of four-part chorales by Bach (1765), p. 24, which includes BWV 8/6 (as No. 47); Right: BWV 8/6, No. 43 p. 24 in Breitkopf's publication of J. S. Bach's four-part chorales, edited by C. P. E. Bach, Vol. I (1784)

According to Winterfeld, Vetter's 1713 setting and the closing chorale of Bach's cantata are largely comparable: he sees it as an example of how Bach could, with a few adjustments, perfect an otherwise already agreeable composition. Winterfeld compared both settings in the Annex of his 1847 publication:

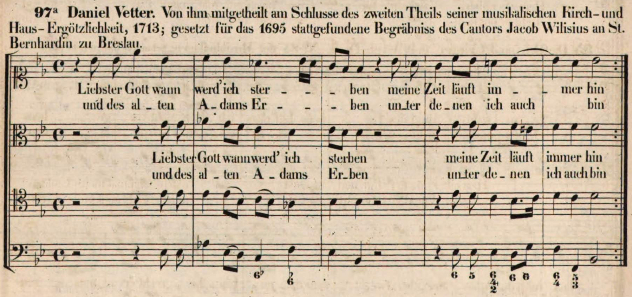
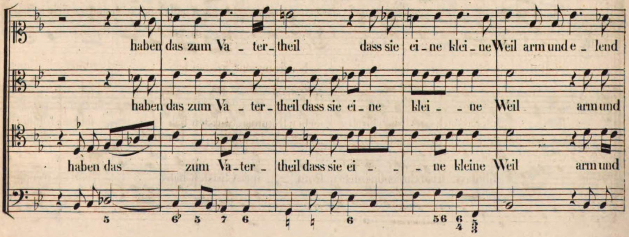
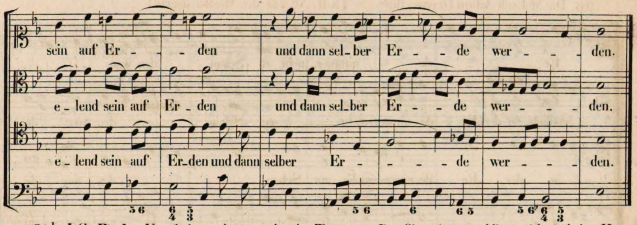
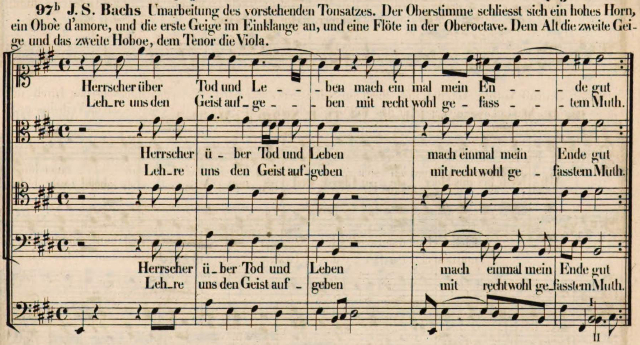
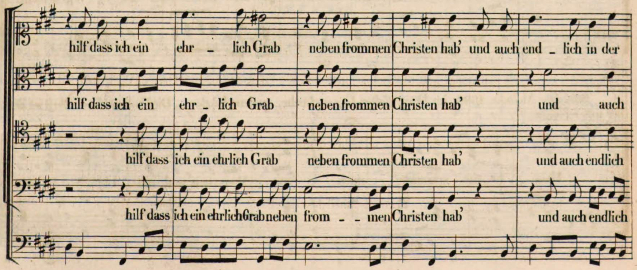
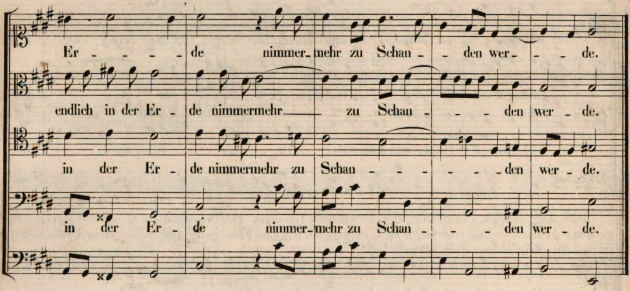
Top row: Vetter's original setting (Winterfeld's example 97a); Bottom row: BWV 8/6 version (example 97b)

The Bach Gesellschaft published the E major version of Bach's chorale cantata in 1851, edited by Moritz Hauptmann. Spitta described the closing chorale of the cantata as a somewhat altered version of Vetter's setting. The BWV 483 setting was published in the Bach Gesellschaft Edition in 1893, edited by Franz Wüllner. Henry Clough-Leighter published the vocal score of the outer movements of the BWV 8 cantata in 1935, with his own piano reduction of the instrumental accompaniment. In the 1975 volume of the Bach-Jahrbuch, Emil Platen described the BWV 8/6 setting as a reworking of Vetter's original. The New Bach Edition (NBE) contains four instances of the BWV 8/6 chorale:

- In E major, orchestrated, as part of the BWV 8.1 cantata, in Vol. I/23 (1982; editor: Helmuth Osthoff).
- In the same volume, the D major version, orchestrated, as part of the BWV 8.2 cantata.
- The E major version of the Dietel manuscript, containing only the vocal parts, in Vol. III/2.1 (1991; edited by Frieder Rempp).
- The same variant, as included in C. P. E. Bach's 18th-century edition of his father's chorales (Breitkopf edition), in Vol. III/2.2 (1996, also edited by Rempp).

Vol. I/23 of the NBE also contains both the E and D major versions of Bach's chorale fantasia on Vetter's "Liebster Gott, wann werd ich sterben" with which the BWV 8 cantata opens. The III/2.1 volume of the NBE includes the E♭ major chorale from the Dietel manuscript (in the publication indicated as BWV 8/6*), and the BWV 483 setting. In the 1998 edition of the Bach-Werke-Verzeichnis, which was co-edited by Alfred Dürr, the BWV 8/6 setting was listed in the third Anhang, that is the Anhang of works spuriously attributed to Bach, with a reference to Platen's Bach-Jahrbuch article: in that version of the catalogue of Bach's works the composition is attributed to Vetter. In 2005, Richard D. P. Jones translated Dürr as writing, in his 1992 book on Bach's cantatas, that BWV 8/6 was "borrowed from Daniel Vetter, albeit with radical alterations." According to the same authors, Vetter's melody "had been commissioned for the burial of the Cantor Jakob Wilisius, and was no doubt especially well known in Leipzig."

=== Setting in Reimann's collection (1747) ===
Johann Balthasar Reimann published his Sammlung alter und neuer Melodien Evangelischer Lieder (Collection of old and new melodies of Evangelical songs) in 1747. As No. 268 it contains a setting for Neumann's "Liebster Gott, wann werd ich sterben". Reimann was the first to publish this sacred song, but it is not his composition. Its tune, Zahn No. 6635, reappeared in an 18th-century manuscript and a 19th-century print.

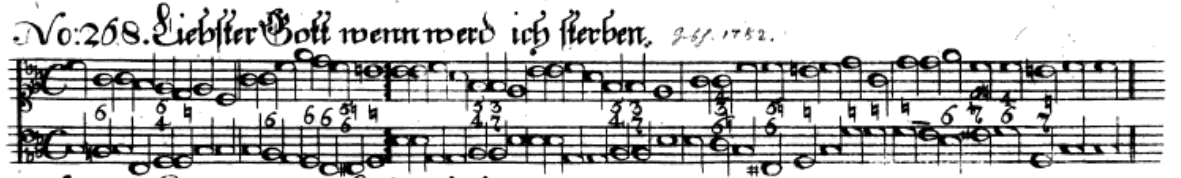
"Liebster Gott, wann werd ich sterben" in Reimann's Sammlung (1747)

== Notes ==
=== Sources ===
- "Liebster Gott, wenn werd ich sterben [1st version] BWV 8.1". Bach Digital. Leipzig: Bach Archive; et al. 8 April 2020.
- "Liebster Gott, wenn werd ich sterben [2nd version] BWV 8.2". Bach Digital. Leipzig: Bach Archive; et al. 8 April 2020.
- "Liebster Gott, wenn werd ich sterben BWV 8/6". Bach Digital. Leipzig: Bach Archive; et al. 22 May 2019.
- "Liebster Gott, wann werd ich sterben (sacred song) BWV 483". Bach Digital. Leipzig: Bach Archive; et al. 11 March 2019.
- "Liebster Gott, wenn werd ich sterben BWV deest (NBA Serie III:2)". Bach Digital. Leipzig: Bach Archive; et al. 15 July 2018.
- "Neumann, Caspar". Bach Digital. Leipzig: Bach Archive; et al. 8 April 2019.
- Ambrose, Z. Philip (2020). "BWV 8 Liebster Gott, wenn werd ich sterben?". J.S. Bach: the Vocal Texts in English Translation with Commentary (3rd ed.). University of Vermont / Xlibris. p. 45. ISBN 9781664119840.
- Bach, Johann Sebastian (1880) [1870s]. When will god recall my spirit: Cantata for the sixteenth Sunday after Trinity. Translated by Troutbeck, John. London: Novello. OCLC 972835050.
- Clough-Leighter, Henry [at Wikidata], ed. (1935). Johann Sebastian Bach: Liebster Gott, wann werd' ich sterben? = When Will God Recall My Spirit? Two choruses for mixed voices from Cantata No. 8. Sacred Music. Vol. 1674. Translated by Troutbeck, John. German words by Kaspar Neumann (vocal score ed.). Boston: E. C. Schirmer. OCLC 30146508. E.C.S. 909.
- Dürr, Alfred; Kobayashi, Yoshitake, eds. (1998). Bach Werke Verzeichnis: Kleine Ausgabe – Nach der von Wolfgang Schmieder vorgelegten 2. Ausgabe [Bach Works Catalogue: Small Edition – After Wolfgang Schmieder's 2nd edition] (in German). Kirsten Beißwenger (collaborator) (BWV^{2a} ed.). Wiesbaden: Breitkopf & Härtel. ISBN 9783765102493. Preface in English and German.
- Dürr, Alfred; Jones, Richard D. P. (2006) [2005]. The Cantatas of J. S. Bach: With Their Librettos in German-English Parallel Text. Oxford University Press. ISBN 9780199297764.
- Ebata, Nobuaki, ed. (6 March 2019). "D-LEb Peters Ms. R 18 (Dietel manuscript)". Bach Digital. Leipzig: Bach Archive; et al.
- Kenney, Sylvia W., ed. (1960). Catalog of the Emilie and Karl Riemenschneider Memorial Bach Library. Baldwin-Wallace College. Columbia University Press. p. 61.
- Koch, Eduard Emil [in German] (1868). Geschichte des Kirchenlieds und Kirchengesangs der christlichen, insbesondere der deutschen evangelischen Kirche: I. Die Dichter und Sänger [History of sacred song and church-singing of the Christian, in particular the Evangelical, Church] (in German). Vol. 5 (3rd ed.). Stuttgart: Belser.
- Müller, Johann Daniel, ed. (1754). Vollständiges Hessen-Hanauisches Choralbuch (in German). Vol. 2. Stock. Register; No. 578: Freu dich sehr o meine Seele.
- Neumann, Caspar (1716). Kern Aller Gebete und Gesänge [Core of all prayers and songs] (in German). Breslau: Christian Brachvogel.
- Platen, Emil (1976). "Zur Echtheit einiger Choralsätze Johann Sebastian Bachs" [On the authenticity of some of Johann Sebastian Bach's chorale settings]. In Schulze, Hans-Joachim; Wolff, Christoph (eds.). Bach-Jahrbuch 1975 [Bach Yearbook 1975]. Bach-Jahrbuch (in German). Vol. 61. Neue Bachgesellschaft. Berlin: Evangelische Verlagsanstalt. pp. 50–62. doi:10.13141/bjb.v1975.
- Schemelli, Georg Christian (1736). Musicalisches Gesang-Buch, Darinnen 954 geistreiche, sowohl alte als neue Lieder und Arien, mit wohlgesetzten Melodien, in Discant und Baß, befindlich sind: Vornehmlich denen Evangelischen Gemeinen im Stifte Naumburg-Zeitz gewidmet (in German). Leipzig: Bernhard Christoph Breitkopf. RISM 990003407 – facsimiles: szMJMq_zmygC at Google Books; 1077430 Liturg. 1372 o at Bavarian State Library; Musicalisches Gesang-Buch (Schemelli, Georg Christian) at IMSLP website.
- Schmieder, Benjamin Friedrich [in German] (1789). Hymnologie, oder, Ueber Tugenden und Fehler der verschiedenen Arten geistlicher Lieder [Hymnology, or, on the virtues and shortcomings of the different types of sacred songs] (in German). Halle: Joh. Gottfried Trampens Wittwe. pp. 306–311.
- Schulze, Hans-Joachim (2017) [2006]. "Foreword". In Kubik, Reinhold (ed.). Johann Sebastian Bach: Liebster Gott, wenn werd ich sterben (O my God, when shall I perish) BWV 8. Stuttgarter Bach-Ausgaben. Translated by Kosviner, David. Bach Archive (Full score ed.). Carus. pp. 4–5. 31.008.
- Spitta, Philipp (1899). Johann Sebastian Bach: His Work and Influence on the Music of Germany, 1685–1750. Translated by Bell, Clara; Fuller Maitland, John Alexander. Novello & Co. Vol. I, Vol. II, Vol. III
- Terry, Charles Sanford (1917). The Hymns and Hymn Melodies of the Cantatas and Motetts. Bach’s Chorals. Vol. II. Cambridge: University Press.
- Unger, Melvin P. (1996). Handbook to Bach's Sacred Cantata Texts: An Interlinear Translation with Reference Guide to Biblical Quotations and Allusions. Scarecrow. ISBN 978-0-8108-2979-4.
- Vetter, Daniel (1713). Musicalische Kirch- und Hauß-Ergötzlichkeit (in German). Vol. 2. Leipzig. OCLC 857536916.
- Yearsley, David [in Dutch] (2019). Sex, Death, and Minuets: Anna Magdalena Bach and Her Musical Notebooks. University of Chicago Press. pp. 217–220. ISBN 9780226617701.
- Wimmer, Gabriel (1749). "XLIII. Liebster GOtt, wenn werd ich sterben?". In Wimmer, Johann Abraham (ed.). Ausführliche Lieder-Erklärung [Extensive clarification of songs] (in German). Vol. IV. Altenburg: Richter. pp. 622–658.
- Winterfeld, Carl von (1847). Der Evangelische Kirchengesang im achtzehnten Jahrhunderte [Evangelical sacred song in the 18th century]. Der evangelische Kirchengesang und sein Verhältniss zur Kunst des Tonsatzes (in German). Vol. III. Leipzig: Breitkopf & Härtel.
- Zahn, Johannes (1891). Die Melodien der deutschen evangelischen Kirchenlieder (in German). Vol. IV. Gütersloh: Bertelsmann.
- Zahn, Johannes (1893). Die Melodien der deutschen evangelischen Kirchenlieder (in German). Vol. VI. Gütersloh: Bertelsmann.
