= Daniel Vetter =

German organist and composer (1657–1721)

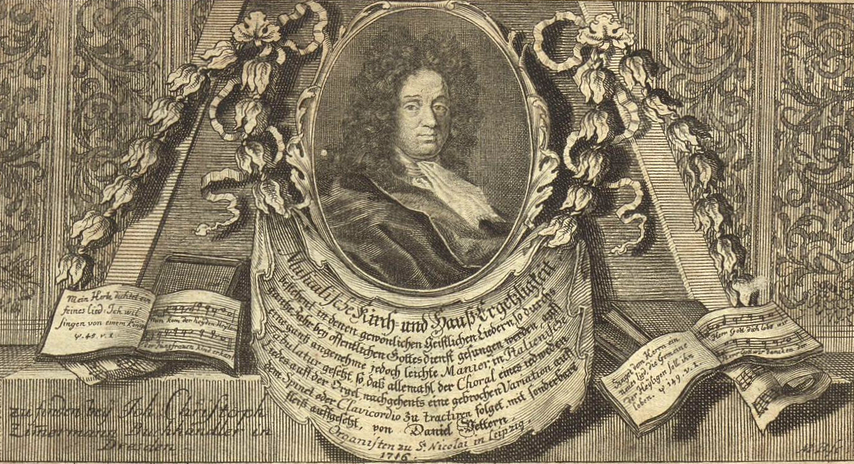
Extract of frontispiece of the first volume of Daniel Vetter's Musicalische Kirch- und Hauß-Ergötzlichkeit (1716 reprint), containing an image of the composer

Daniel Vetter (1657/58 – 7 February 1721) was an organist and composer of the German Baroque era.

== Life ==
Born in Breslau, Vetter became a pupil of Werner Fabricius in Leipzig. When Fabricius died in 1679, Vetter succeeded him as organist of the St. Nicholas Church. Some time before 1695 he wrote a melody for Jakob Wilisius, who at the time was cantor in Breslau, and to whom he was befriended. That hymn tune, Zahn No. 6634, was sung at the cantor's funeral in Breslau, in 1695.

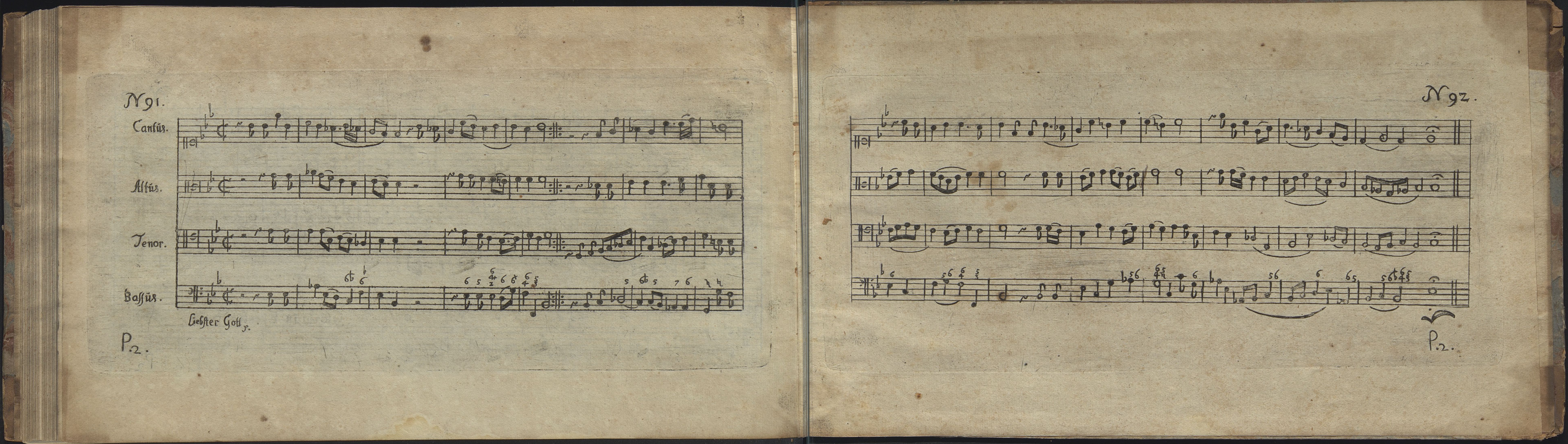
Daniel Vetter's four-part chorale "Liebster Gott", the final pages of the second volume of his musical anthology, published in 1713

Vetter published the first volume of his Musicalische Kirch- und Hauß-Ergötzlichkeit in 1709. From 1710 to 1716 he supervised the construction of the new organ built by Johann Scheibe in the church of the university of Leipzig, an organ that was tested in 1717 over a three-day period by Johann Sebastian Bach in Vetter's presence. Meanwhile, the second volume of his Musicalische Kirch- und Hauß-Ergötzlichkeit was published in 1713. It contained a four-part setting of the Zahn 6634 melody, to the text of Caspar Neumann's "Liebster Gott, wann werd ich sterben" hymn. Vetter remained organist of St. Nicholas in Leipzig until his death in 1721.

== Works ==
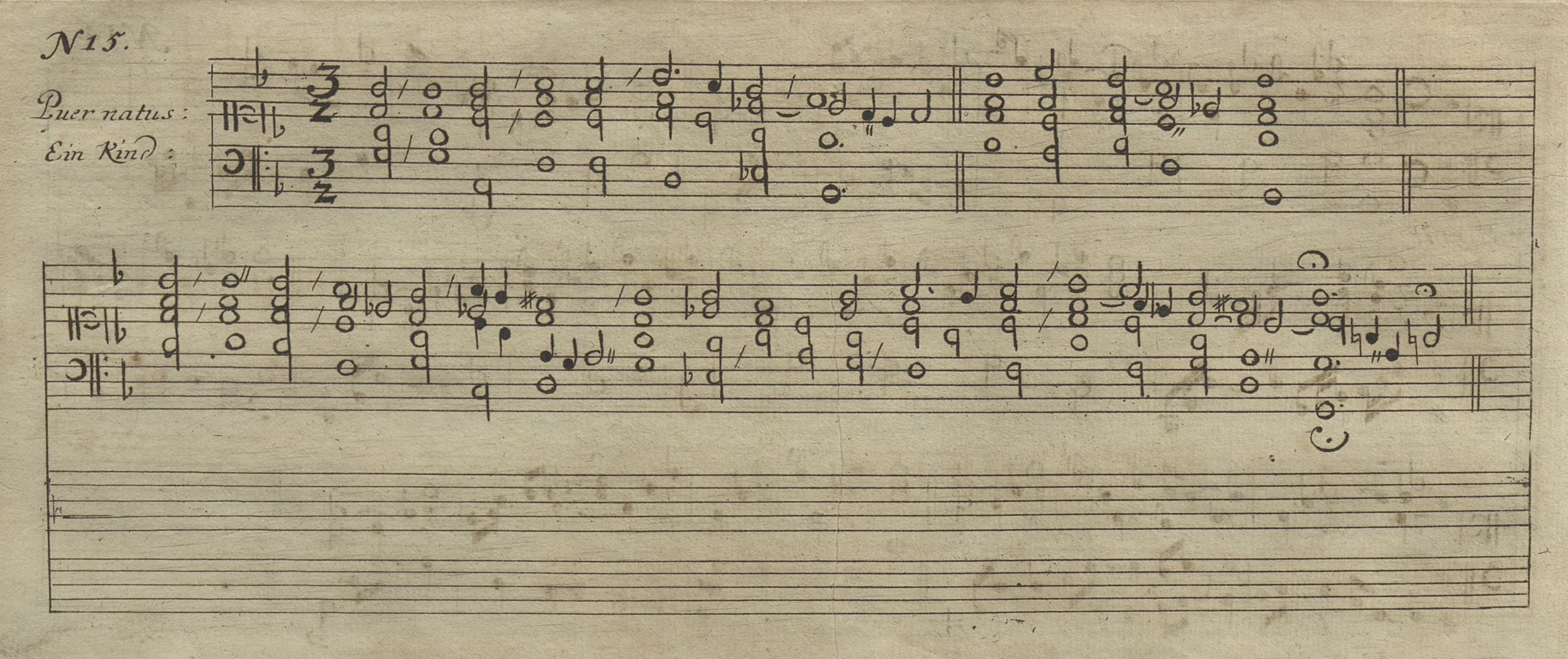
Christmas Carol "Puer natus", No. 15 from Vetter's Musicalische Kirch- und Hauß-Ergötzlichkeit

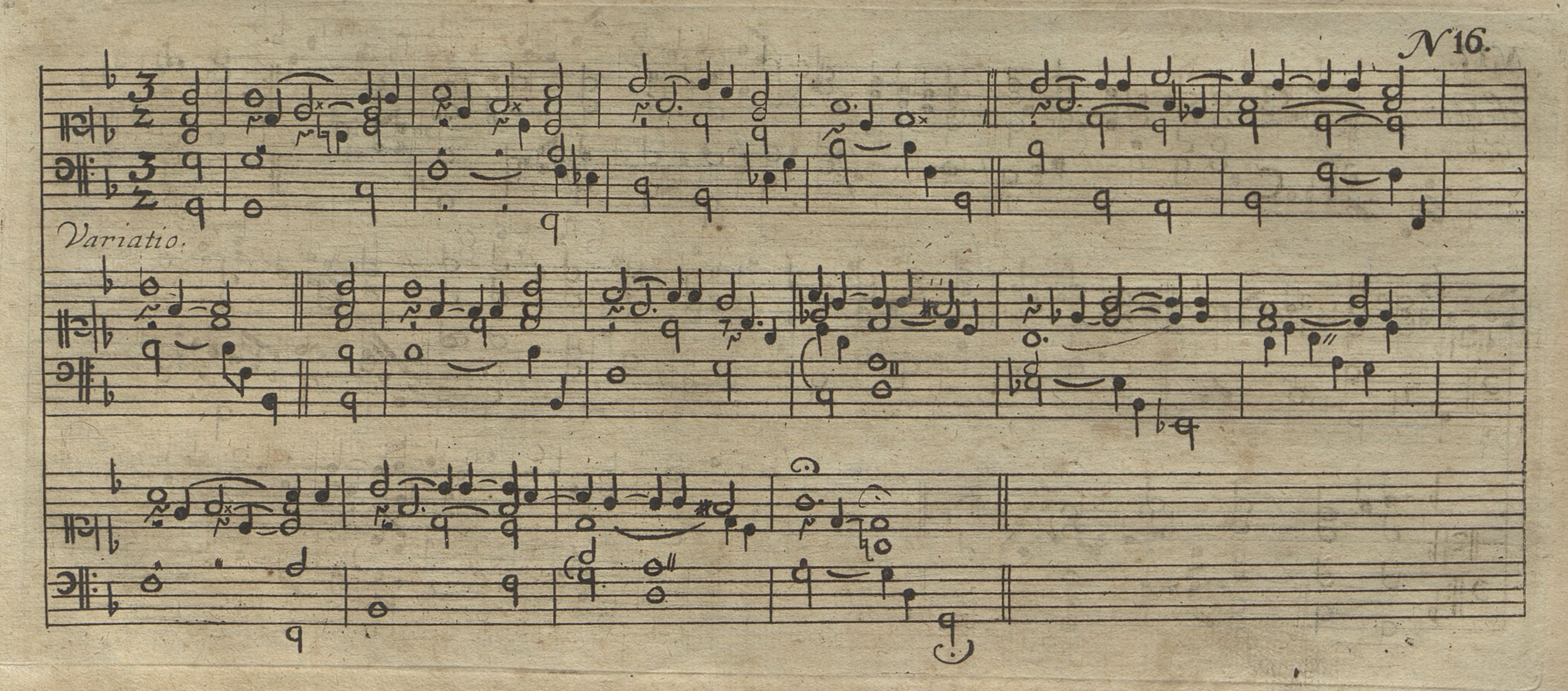
Variation on "Puer natus", No. 16 from Vetter's collection

=== Publications ===
Vetter published two volumes of Musicalische Kirch- und Hauß-Ergötzlichkeit (lit. 'Musical church- and home-delectation'):

- The first volume, containing 130 four-part settings of hymn tunes was published In Leipzig in 1709, and reprinted in Dresden in 1716.
- The second volume, containing 91 more settings of chorale melodies, was published in 1713.

The collection contains settings of 117 hymn tunes: most melodies appear first in a setting for organ, followed by a more ornate setting for stringed keyboard instrument. Apart from a volume containing seven pieces by Heinrich Buttstett (Musikalische Klavierkunst und Vorratskammer, 1713) it was the only keyboard music published in Leipzig in the first quarter of the 18th century. Vetter's collection is a cross-over of settings for accompaniment of singing, and instrumental chorale preludes.

=== Other compositions ===
Some of Vetter's compositions survive as manuscripts:

- Alleluja Christus von den Toten auferwecket for SSATB soloists and choir, and orchestra. Parts copied for a performance in Grimma in 1682.
- Veni sancte spiritus à 14, for SSATB soloists and choir, strings, winds and organ. Parts copied for a performance in Grimma in 1682.
- Ich will dem Herren singen so lang ich lebe, motet for double SATB choir, dedicated to Johann Schelle. The manuscript consists of vocal parts, copied in 1701, the year Schelle died.
- Heut freue dich Christenheit, sacred concerto for voices, strings and organ, for the second Sunday of Advent. Copy of the score.

== Reception ==
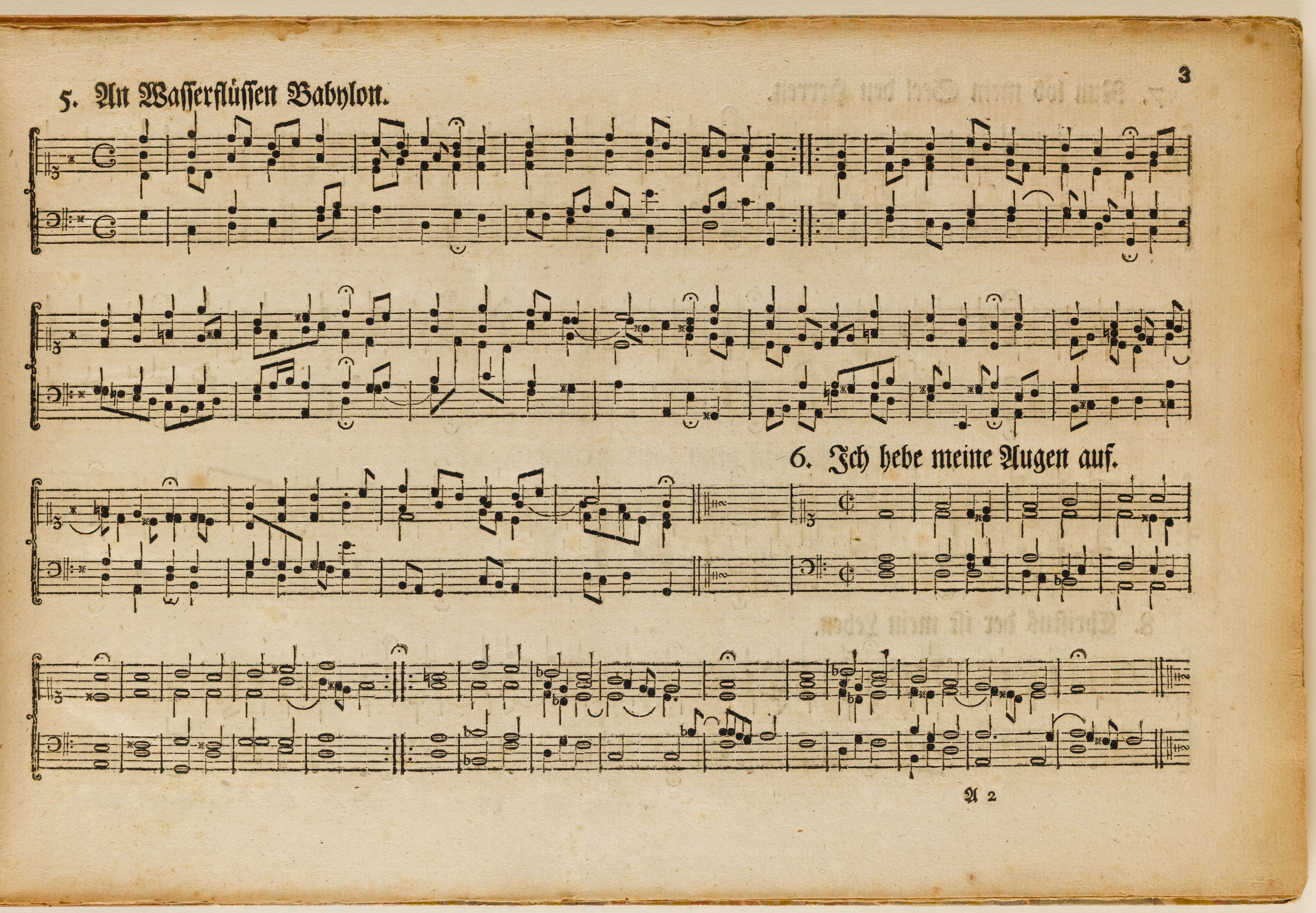
Friedrich Wilhelm Birnstiel's first volume of Bach chorales (1765), p. 3, containing BWV 267 by J. S. Bach and BWV Anh. 203 by D. Vetter

Some of the settings from the second volume of Vetter's Musicalische Kirch- und Hauß-Ergötzlichkeit were adopted in Friedrich Wilhelm Birnstiel's first publication of four-part chorales by Johann Sebastian Bach (1765). The sixth and last movement of Liebster Gott, wenn werd ich sterben? BWV 8, one of Bach's chorale cantatas, is a reworked version of Vetter's four-part setting of the hymn with the same name, with radical alterations, however close enough to Vetter's original to be marked as a work spuriously attributed to Bach in the 1998 edition of the Bach-Werke-Verzeichnis (BWV).

Vetter's four-part settings in Birnstiel's 1765 Volume
Vetter 1713	Title	Birnstiel 1765	BWV
5	O Traurigkeit, o Herzeleid	18	Anh. 204
20	Ich hebe meine Augen auf	6	Anh. 203
29	Gott hat das Evangelium	31	Anh. 202
35	Du Friedefürst, Herr Jesu Christ	15	Anh. 201
91	Liebster Gott, wann werd ich sterben	47	8/6alia

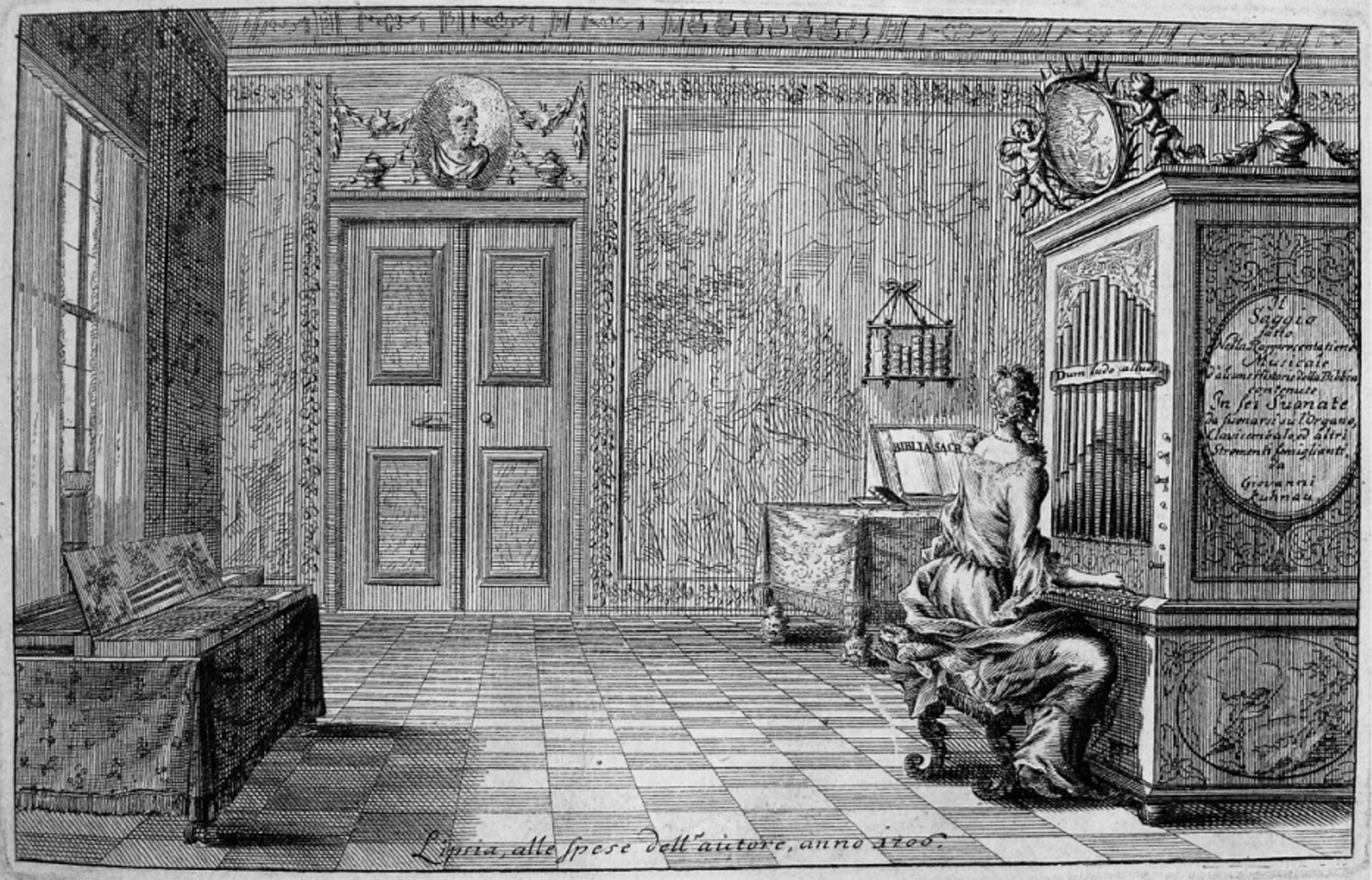
Engraving of 1710 frontispiece for Kuhnau's Leipzig Biblical Sonatas, showing an idealised music room, with a house organ next to a bible on the right, and a clavichord and a partly hidden harpsichord on the left

Modern commentary on Vetter's chorales has varied. In the most recent version of Grove's Dictionary, Marshall (2001) states that: "Although these pieces have been severely criticized by modern writers as primitive, the appearance of a second part suggests they were popular in their time." The musicologist Peter Williams has compared settings of Vetter's with Bach's short chorale preludes from Orgelbüchlein, which date from exactly the same period: according to Williams, Vetter's treatments were "competent but jejune". As a specific comparison, Williams has taken the first chorale Nun komm der Heiden Heiland: for him Vetter's clavichord or spinet setting as a French prélude is less convincing then Bach's setting BWV 599; "the opening chorale’s expressive tmesis or semiquaver break in the melody of bar 1, imitated in the following alto and tenor, was the result of second thoughts—a tiny but clear example of creative thinking, and typical of the album." Writing from the perspective of Bach's biography, Williams suggests that "J. S. Bach wished to surpass Vetter in his own work." Rose (2005) also compares the two treatments of Nun komm der Heiden Heiland by Vetter and Bach. He states that whereas "Bach makes the chord-breaking into a contrapuntal figure that pushes the texture forward and creates constant variety", Vetter's uniform and automatic resort to broken-chord figures is "astounding". As Rose comments, this predictability led Gotthold Frotscher in the 1930s to accuse Vetter of "lacking creative power" in these works. Rose and Rathey (2010) have examined the anthology in the context of late seventeenth– and early eighteenth–century music-making and domestic worship in Germany: the chorales were aimed at the pious merchant class in Leipzig, with simple four-point settings for organ coupled with clavichord or spinet broken-chord settings in the fashionable luthé or brisé style. The preface to Vetter's second volume states that no great degree of proficiency was required for performers of his chorales; nevertheless, even the highly accomplished keyboard player Anna Amalia, the sister of Frederick the Great, had a copy of Vetter's chorales in her personal library. Leaver (2017) outlines the relevance of Vetter's 1713 second preface in the role of Lutheran worship, where Vetter explains "the spiritual benefits of music, especially the practice of singing hymns after meals, and does so by reference to Luther." Leaver infers that Bach's use of Vetter's final chorale "Liebster Gott" for the 1724 cantata BWV 8, "implies that he had probably read Vetter’s preface referring to Luther."
