= Bernhard Friedrich Richter =

German musician (1850–1931)

Bernhard Friedrich Richter (1 August 1850 – 16 April 1931) was a German church musician in Leipzig, holding the position of Thomaskantor interim in 1892–93. He was also a Bach scholar.

== Leben ==
Richter was born in Leipzig, the son of the musician Ernst Friedrich Richter and the brother of the composer Alfred Richter. He received first organ lessons from his father, and attended then the Thomasschule. In 1876, Richter was appointed organist at the Jakobskirche in Leipzig. He also worked, from 1890, as church musician at the Lutherkirche, and as voice teacher at the Thomasschule. After the death of Thomaskantor Wilhelm Rust in 1892, he held the position interim, until Gustav Schreck was elected the following year.

Richter was promoted to Kirchenmusikdirektor in 1908, and to Royal Professor in 1917. He is known for publications focused on the life and work of Johann Sebastian Bach.

Richter died in Leipzig at age 80.

== Publications ==
- Die Wahl Johann Sebastian Bachs zum Kantor der Thomasschule im Jahre 1723, In: Bach-Jahrbuch, vol. 2, 1905, pp. 48–67.
- Über die Schicksale der der Thomasschule zu Leipzig angehörenden Kantaten Johann Sebastian Bachs, In: Bach-Jahrbuch vol. 3, 1906, pp. 43–73.
- Über Sebastian Bachs Kantaten mit obligater Orgel, In: Bach-Jahrbuch, vol. 5, 1908, pp. 43–73.
- Johann Sebastian Bach im Gottesdienst der Thomaner, In: Bach-Jahrbuch, vol. 12, 1915, pp. 49–63.
- Die Kantoren der Thomasschule und ihre Bedeutung für die evangelische Kirchenmusik: eine Skizze, In: Der Thomanerchor zu Leipzig: Sonderheft des 'Kirchenchors', Leipzig, 1920, pp. 3–12.
