= Emil Platen =

German choir director and musicologist

Emil Platen (born 16 September 1925) is a German musicologist and conductor.

== Life ==
Born in Düsseldorf, Platen received his first music lessons at the Jugendmusikschule Düsseldorf in the disciplines violin and music theory/composition (with Reger's student Otto Leonhardt). After work and military service (1943–45) he enrolled in 1946 at the University of Cologne in the subject musicology, changed in 1947 to the Hochschule für Musik Detmold, where he studied composition with Wilhelm Maler, viola with Hermann Hirschfelder and choral conducting with Kurt Thomas. After his examination as a choral conductor, he resumed his musicological studies at the University of Bonn in 1951, which he completed in 1957 with a dissertation on the "Chorische Choralbearungen von Joh. Bach" which won him his doctorate. During his studies he worked as a violist in various ensembles in Bonn and at Westdeutscher Rundfunk Köln. Further stages in his professional career were: 1959 research assistant at the Beethoven-Archiv Bonn, 1963 academic music director and 1971 honorary professor for musicology at the University of Bonn. In 1969 he founded the North Rhine-Westphalia Youth Symphony Orchestra together with Hans-Josef Menke. After his retirement, he was a lecturer for music history at the Hochschule für Musik und Tanz Köln from 1994 to 2003.

With the Forum Musik und Tanz der Universität Bonn, which he himself founded in 1953, he undertook numerous concert tours in Europe and overseas. His research focuses on the theory of musical forms and the works of J. S. Bach and L. van Beethoven.

== Publications ==
- Untersuchungen zur Struktur der chorischen Choralbearbeitung Johann Sebastian Bachs, Diss. Bonn 1957,
- Die Matthäus-Passion von Johann Sebastian Bach. Werkeinführung, Munich and Kassel 1991, 4. verb. u. erg. Aufl. 2012
- Bachs lutherische Messen.
- Studien zu Bach und Beethoven, Chemnitz 2000.
- Ludwig van Beethoven, ed. of several volumes of the Urtext edition and complete edition. Munich: Henle

== Literature ==
- Martella Gutiérrez-Denhoff (ed.): Collegium Musicologicum. Festschrift Emil Platen zum Sechzigsten Geburtstag. Beethoven-Archiv, Bonn 1985.
- Bernhard Hartmann: Der Bonner Musikwissenschaftler Emil Platen wird 90 Jahre. General-Anzeiger. Bonn, 16 September 2015.

== Sources ==
- Riemann Musiklexikon, Supplementary volume, personal part, Mainz 1975
- Honegger-Massenkeil, Das Große Lexikon der Musik, vol. 6, Freiburg 1976
- Die Musik in Geschichte und Gegenwart, 2nd edition, personal part
- Kürschners Deutscher Gelehrten-Kalender
