= Friedrich Wilhelm Marpurg =

German music critic, theorist, and composer (1718–1795)

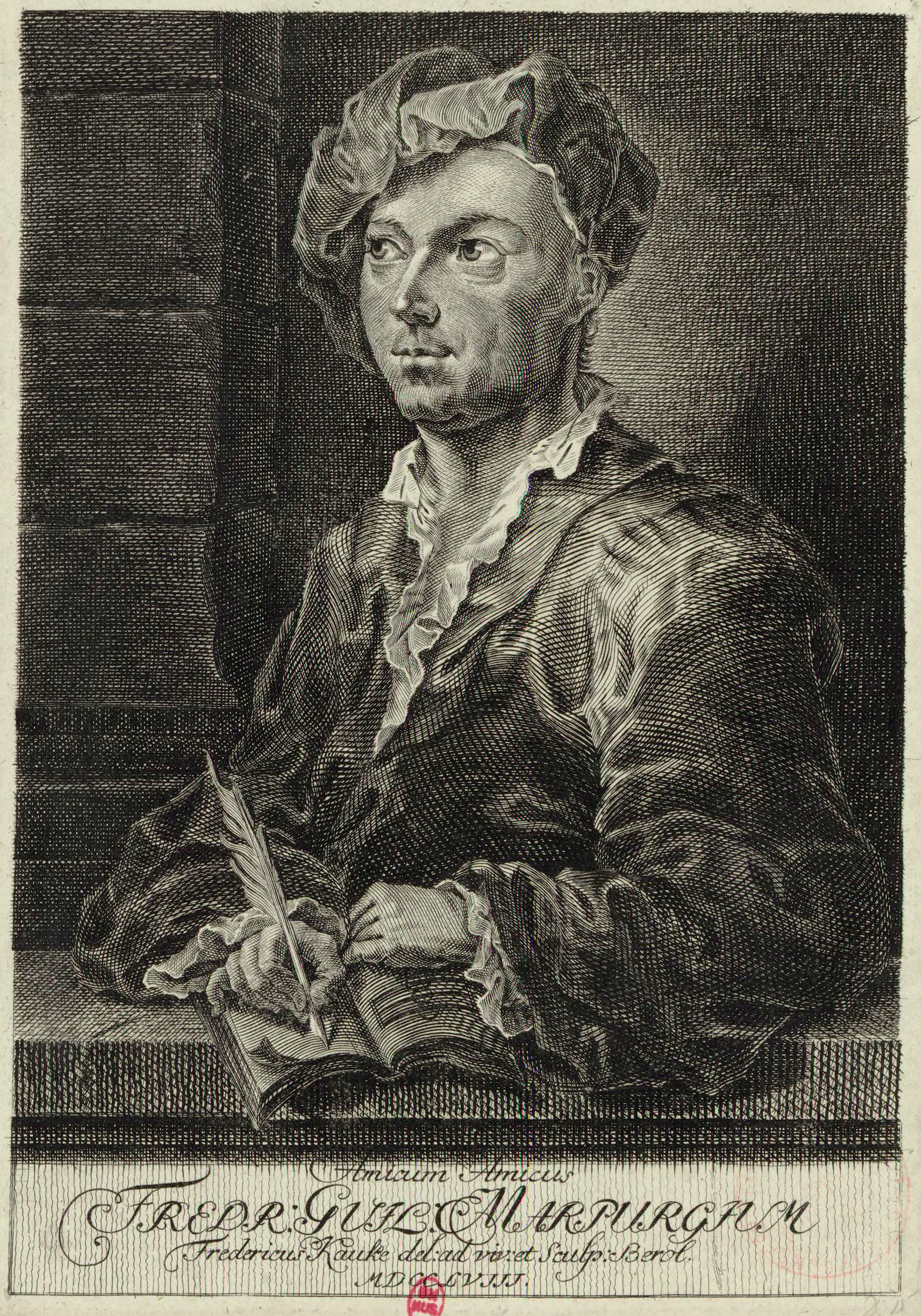
Friedrich Wilhelm Marpurg, German music critic in the Age of Enlightenment. Etching by Berol after a drawing by Friedrich Kauke (1758).

Friedrich Wilhelm Marpurg (21 November 1718 – 22 May 1795) was a German music critic, music theorist and composer. Described as "one of Germany's leading mid[18th-]century music critics," he was friendly and active with many figures of the Enlightenment.

== Life ==
Little is known of Marpurg's early life. According to various sources, he studied "philosophy" and music. It is clear that he enjoyed a strong education and was friendly with various leading figures of the Enlightenment, including Winckelmann and Lessing. In 1746, he travelled to Paris as the secretary for a General named either Rothenberg or Bodenberg. There, he became acquainted with intellectuals including the writer and philosopher Voltaire, the mathematician d'Alembert and the composer Jean-Philippe Rameau.

After 1746, he returned to Berlin where he was more or less independent. Marpurg's offer to write exclusively for Breitkopf & Härtel was declined by the firm in 1757. In 1760, he received an appointment to the Royal Prussian Lotteries, whose director he became in 1763, receiving the title of War Councillor. His son, Johann Friedrich Marpurg, who later became a celebrated violinist, was born in 1766.

Marpurg's quarrelsome disposition and his enthusiasm for public polemics made him many enemies. Contemporaries also described him, however, as courteous and open-hearted.

Marpurg is most likely at the source of a two-centuries misunderstanding that J. S. Bach would have been using the equal temperament for the performance of "Das Wohltemperirte Clavier", because of his publication "Versuch über die musikalische Temperatur", 1776. This misunderstanding was only much later first challenged by Robert Holford Bosanquet in "An Elementary Treatise on Musical Intervals and Temperament" 1876, pp. 29–30, but this position did not acquire fame. The above position of Bosanquet, that a distinction should be made between "well temperament" and "equal temperament" was rediscovered by H. Kelletat, and thoroughly defended and analysed historically in "Zur musikalischen Temperatur", 1960, especially p. 32. Thanks to this publication by H. Kelletat, almost all musicologists subscribe to this distinction nowadays.

== Works ==
Marpurg published the bulk of his writings on music between 1750 and 1763. After he had attained his lottery position in 1763, he penned two works on this topic but continued to write on wider areas of music.

One of the first (and most influential) works of Marpurg was his tract on the Fugue (1753) which is considered one of the oldest sources for the performance practice of J.S. Bach's Art of the Fugue. His Handbuch bey dem Generalbasse und der Composition and the translation of d'Alembert's Elémens de musique stand at the beginning of Rameau's reception in German harmonic theory. Other works treat questions of instrumental performance, vocal music, music history and mathematical music theory. His journal projects continued to promote the institution of German music criticism in the wake of Mattheson and Scheibe; his Kritische Briefe über die Tonkunst contains significant contributions to the theory of meter, the esthetics of the ode and other topics of current interest. His manuscript work on the ancient water organ remained unfinished. The scope and unprecedented clarity of Marpurg's writings on music made him the leading German music theorist of the late eighteenth century; he and his rivals Kirnberger and Schulz made up a distinct "Berlin School" of music criticism and theory.

== Selected works ==
- Der critische Musicus an der Spree, 1750
- Die Kunst das Clavier zu spielen, 1750, enh. ed. 1762
- Abhandlungen von der Fuge, 1753
- Historisch-kritische Beyträge zur Aufnahme der Musik, 1756–78
- Anleitung zum Clavierspielen, 1755 – partial online edition: http://www.koelnklavier.de/quellen/marpurg-klav/_index.html
- Raccolta delle più Nuove Composizioni di Clavicembalo di Differenti Maestri ed Autori, 1756 : Ouverture en Sol, Concerto en Ut, Sinfonia en Sol, Marche des Pèlerins, 2 Menuets & Polonnoise
- Raccolta delle più Nuove Composizioni di Clavicembalo di Differenti Maestri ed Autori, 1757 : Concerto en Si bémol, 2 Menuets, 3 mélodies* Anfangsgründe der theoretischen Musik, 1757/60
- Handbuch bey dem Generalbasse und der Composition, 1757–62
- Anleitung zur Singcomposition 1758/59
- Kritische Einleitung in die Geschichte und Lehrsätze der alten und neuen Musik, 1759
- Kritische Briefe über die Tonkunst, 1759–63
- Anleitung zur Musik überhaupt, und zur Singkunst besonders, 1763
- Die Kunst sein Glück spielend zu machen. Oder ausführliche Nachricht von der italienischen, und nach Art derselben zu Berlin, Paris und Brüssel etc. errichteten Zahlen-Lotterie zwischen 1 und 90 : mit beygefügten Planen, sein Geld bey selbiger mit Vortheil anzulegen, 1765
- Friedrich Wilhelm Marpurgs Anfangsgründe des Progressionalcalculs überhaupt, und des figürlichen und combinatorischen besonders, wie auch des logarithmischen, trigonometrischen und Decimalcalculs, nebst der Lehre von der Ausziehung der Wurzeln und der Construction der eckigten geometrischen Körper, 1774
- Versuch über die musikalische Temperatur, 1776
- Legende einiger Musikheiligen, 1786
- Neue Methode allerley Arten von Temperaturen dem Claviere aufs bequemste mitzuteilen, 1790

== Discography ==
- Marpourg. Pièces de clavecin. Yves Préfontaine, clavecin d’après Hemsch par Yves Beaupré. ATMA Classique ACD 2 2119 (1996, rééd. 2007);
- Friedrich Wilhelm Marpurg : Complete harpsichord works, 2CD, Francesco Mazzoli, harpsichord made by Claudio Tuzzi, copy of the 1769 Pascal Taskin, La Jeune Classicité, Paris, DJK 005 2014.
