= Caspar Neumann =

German professor and clergyman

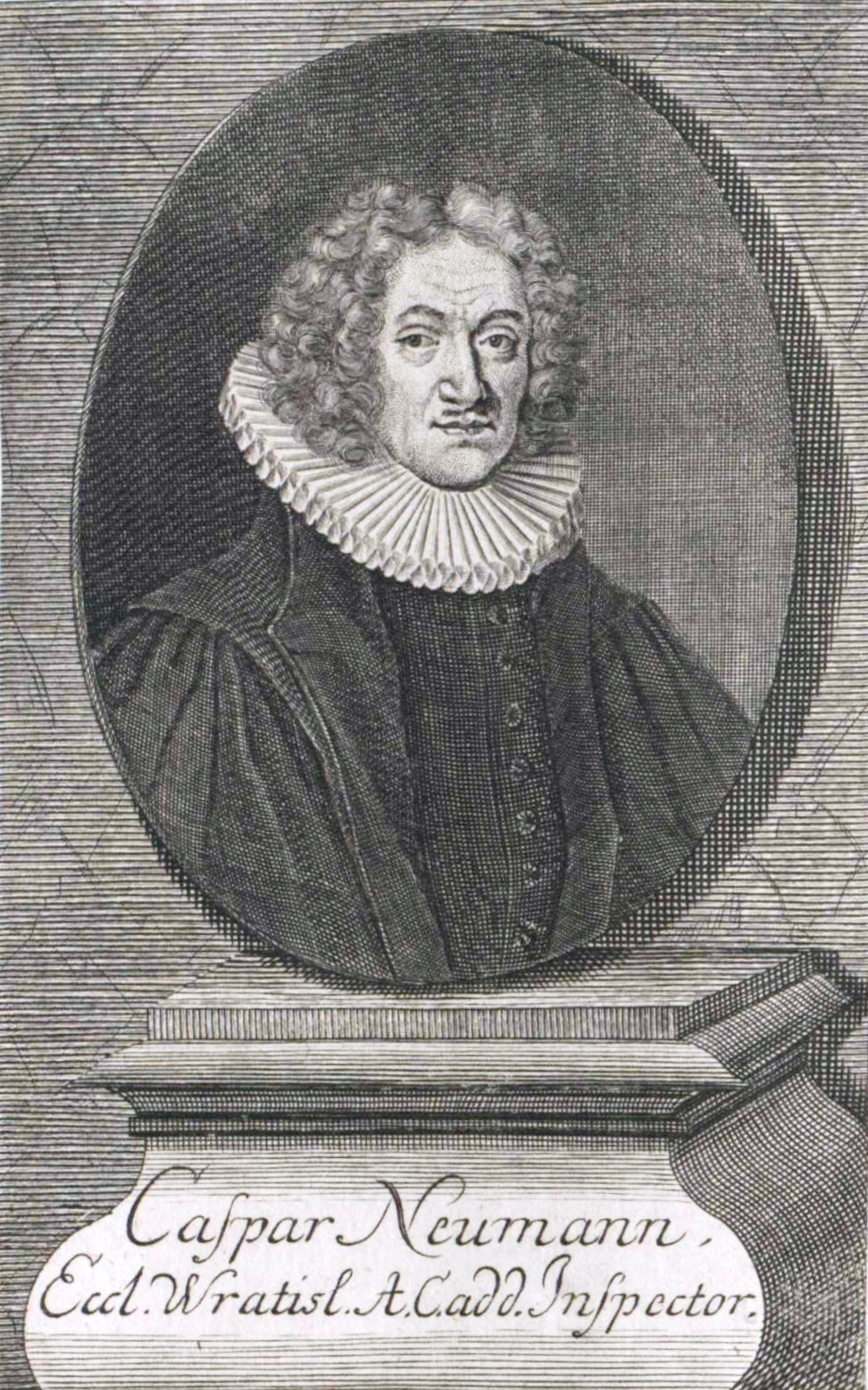
- Caspar Neumann.
- Born: 14 September 1648; Breslau
- Died: 27 January 1715 (aged 66)
- Education: University of Jena
- Occupations: Professor and clergyman

Caspar (or Kaspar) Neumann (14 September 1648 – 27 January 1715) was a German professor and clergyman from Breslau with a special scientific interest in mortality rates.

== Biography ==
Caspar Neuman was born September 14, 1648, in Breslau, to Martin Neumann, the city tax collector. The later clergyman first did an apprenticeship as a pharmacist. He finished his higher school education at Breslau's Maria-Magdalen grammar school. In 1667 he became a student of theology at the University of Jena, and on 30 November 1673 was ordained as a priest, having been requested as a traveling chaplain for Prince Christian, the son of Ernest I, Duke of Saxe-Gotha. On his return home, following a two-year journey through western Germany, Switzerland, northern Italy, and southern France, he became a court-chaplain at Altenburg, and married the daughter of J. J. Rabe, physician in ordinary to the prince of Saxe-Friedenstein. In 1678 he was made the deacon of St. Maria-Magdalen in Breslau and became pastor in 1689. In Breslau he married, in his second marriage, Christiana Greiffen, daughter of Christian Greiffen, merchant in Breslau, and Sophia Regina Lindsay from Annaberg im Erzgebirge, daughter of a Scottish nobleman David Lindsay, Royal Saxon Privy Councillor and Mill Administrator in Annaberg.

== Later career ==
In 1680 he published his prayer-book under the title Kern aller Gebete in Jena. In 1689 he became vicar of St. Maria Magdalen, Breslau. His observations on the city's mortality rates resulted in the treatise “Reflexionen über Leben und Tod bey denen in Breslau Geborenen und Gestorbenen” which he finally sent to Leibniz – the covering letter is documented, the text itself is lost. Leibniz seems to have informed the Royal Society of Neumann's work. The Society's secretary Henri Justel invited Neumann in 1691 to provide the Society with the data he had collected. Neumann sent two letters about his data to the Society in January and December, 1692. Justell responded with interest, but died in September 1693. Neumann's second letter was read out to the Society in November. Edmond Halley's computations, digesting Neumann's data, were published in 1994 in the 1693 volume of the Philosophical Transactions of the Royal Society. Neumann's letters, presumed lost, were rediscovered at the end of the nineteenth century in the archives of the Royal Society; they have subsequently been translated into English. As a result of Neumann's scientific research, he was elected to the Berlin Academy of Sciences in 1706.

In 1697 Neumann was appointed inspector of the Protestant schools and churches of Breslau. He eventually became vicar of St. Elisabeth and professor of theology at both the city's grammar schools. Neumann influenced Johann Christian Kundmann (1684–1751), who later published the first German comparative study of mortality rates in the Sammlung von Natur- Medizin- sowie auch dazu gehörigen Kunst- und Litteraturgeschichten (1718) ff.

Neumann left a legacy of more than 30 hymns, many of which were included in Burg's Gesang Buch (Breslau: 1746) and in the ninth edition of the Breslau Vollständige Kirchen-und Haus-Music (c. 1700)

He was also known for his theory that the individual Hebrew letters had "hieroglyphic" meanings. The letter aleph, for instance, representing the idea of activity, beth, the idea of three dimensions, etc. (See his work Clavis Domus Heber, pp. 3,10.) Around 1712, Isaac Newton wrote to Neumann, acknowledging receipt of his book, Clavis Domus Heber, and congratulating him on the endeavor, but professing himself insufficiently skilled in Hebrew to make a responsible judgment as to its success.

== Hymns ==
- "Adam hat im Paradies"
- "Auf, mein Herz, des Herren Tag"
- "Gottes und Marien Sohn"
- "Grosser Gott, von alten Zeiten" (Great God of Ages!)
- "Herr! auf Erden muss ich leiden" (Lord, on Earth I Dwell Sad-Hearted)
- "Liebster Gott, wann werd ich sterben"
- "Mein Gott, nun ist es wieder Morgen"
- "Nun bricht die finstre Nacht herein"

== Publications ==
- Kern aller Gebete. Breslau, 1680. (1697 Nurnberg Edition:)
- Genesis linguae sancte V[eteris] T[estament]: Perspicue docens Vulgo sic dictas Radices non esse vera Hebraeorum Primativa; Sed Voces, ab alio quodam, Radicibus his priore & Simpliciore Principio deductas. Nuremberg, 1696 .
- Bigam Difficultatum Physico-Sacrarum: De Gemmis Urim & Tummim ... & De Cibo Samariae obsessae ... Una cum Responsione ad Quaestionem amici, num Potus, Caffe dicti, aliqva in Sacris dentur vestigia? 1709.
- Clavis Domus Heber. 1712.

== Literature ==
- Graetzer, Jonas, "Edmund Halley und Caspar Neumann - Ein Beitrag zur Geschichte der Bevölkerungs-Statistik", Breslau 1883 (Göttinger Digitalisierungszentrum)
- Schimmelpfennnig, K. A., "Kaspar Neumann (1648-1715)", in ADB, 23 (1886).
- Lischke, Ralph-Jürgen, Caspar Neumann (1648–1715). Ein Beitrag zur Geschichte der Sterbetafeln, ed. Institut für Angewandte Demographie GmbH (Berlin, 1998).
