= Hans-Joachim Schulze =

German musicologist

- Born: 3 December 1934 (age 91); Leipzig, Saxony, Germany
- Education: University of Music and Theatre Leipzig; University of Leipzig; University of Rostock
- Occupation: Musicologist
- Organizations: University of Music and Theatre Leipzig; Bach Archive

Hans-Joachim Schulze (born 3 December 1934) is a German musicologist, a Bach scholar who served as the director of the Bach Archive in Leipzig from 1992 to 2000. With Christoph Wolff, he was editor of the Bach-Jahrbuch (Bach yearbook) from 1975 to 2000. He published an introduction to all cantatas by Johann Sebastian Bach in 2006.

== Career ==
Born in Leipzig, Schulze studied musicology and German studies at the University of Music and Theatre Leipzig from 1952 to 1954, and at the University of Leipzig from 1954 to 1957. He worked at the Bach Archive in Leipzig as its director from 1992 to 2000. He achieved a Ph.D. at the University of Rostock with studies of the history of Bach tradition in the 18th century (Studien zur Bach-Überlieferung im 18. Jahrhundert). He was awarded the Hanns Eisler Prize in 1973 for the Dokumente zum Nachwirken Johann Sebastian Bachs 1750–1800 (Documents of the legacy of Johann Sebastian Bach 1750–1800), which he edited.

In 1993, Schulze was appointed Honorarprofessor at the University of Music and Theatre Leipzig. From 1975 to 2000, he was the co-editor of the Bach-Jahrbuch (Bach yearbook), together with Christoph Wolff. He has been a member of the Sächsische Akademie der Wissenschaften zu Leipzig since 2001.

In 2006, he published Die Bach-Kantaten: Einführung zu sämtlichen Kantaten Johann Sebastian Bachs, an introduction to all cantatas by Johann Sebastian Bach. The introductions were originally written for weekly broadcasts of Bach cantatas on Mitteldeutscher Rundfunk, begun in the early 1990s and covering 226 cantatas over a period of five years. Schulze included not only musicological facts, such as the structure of a work, but also social context, reliability of a work's sources, and relation to other compositions.

== Publications ==
- Bach-Dokumente volumes I–III and V. Kassel and Leipzig 1963–72, 2007 (vol. I and II with Werner Neumann)
- Johann Gottfried Walther, Briefe. Leipzig 1987 (with Klaus Beckmann)
- Bach Compendium, Leipzig and Frankfurt. 1986 (with Christoph Wolff)
- Studien zur Bach-Überlieferung im 18. Jahrhundert. Leipzig, 1984
- Die Bach-Kantaten: Einführung zu sämtlichen Kantaten Johann Sebastian Bachs, Evangelische Verlagsanstalt / Carus, 2006
