= Bach Archive =

Music archive in Leipzig

Coordinates: 51°20′20″N 12°22′20″E

Logo of the Bach-Archiv Leipzig

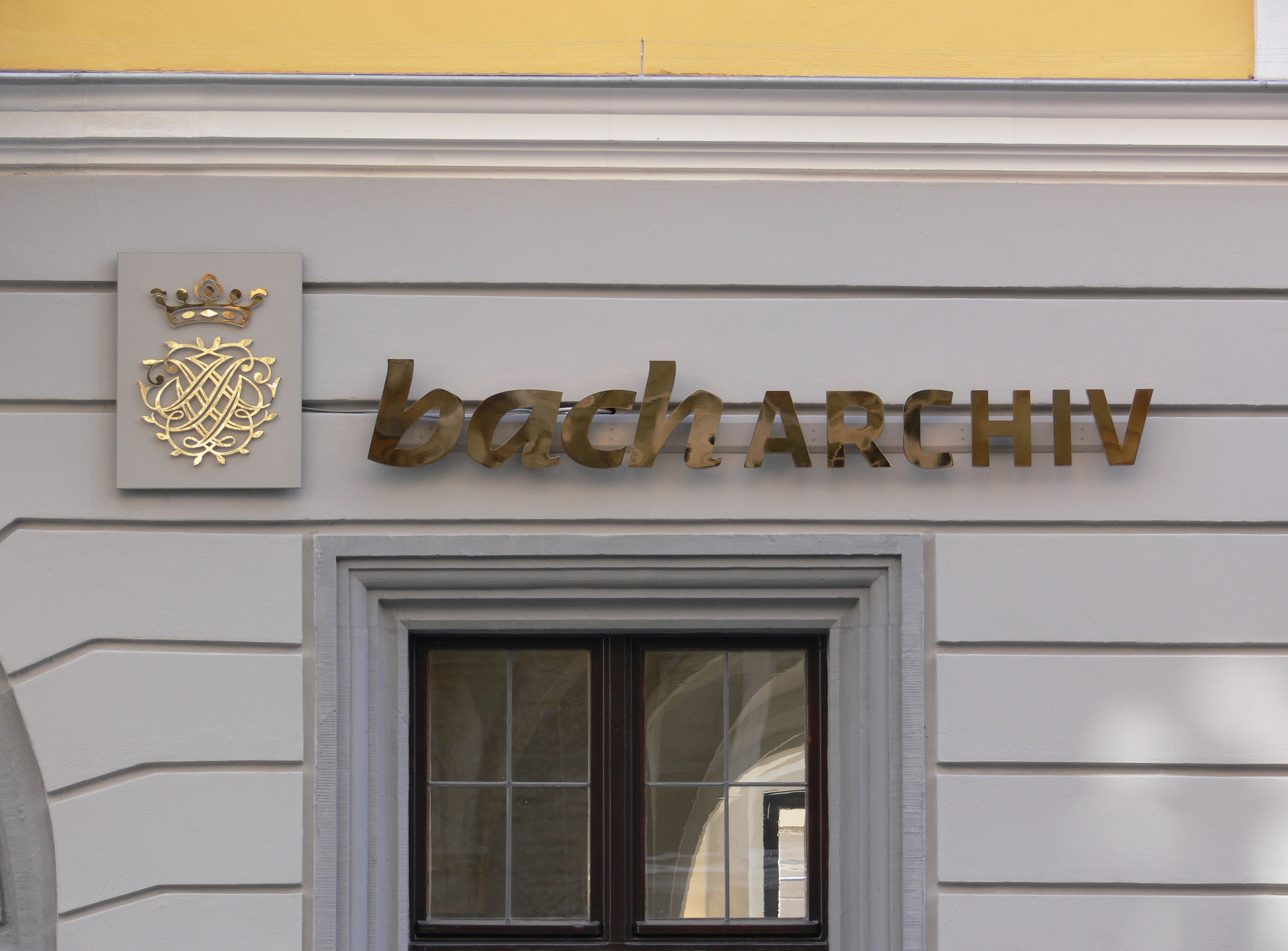
Bach-Archiv

The Bach-Archiv Leipzig or Bach-Archiv is an institution for the documentation and research of the life and work of Johann Sebastian Bach. The Bach-Archiv also researches the Bach family, especially their music. Based in Leipzig, the city where Bach lived from 1723 until his death, the Archiv is recognised by the German government as a "cultural beacon" of national importance. Since 2008 the Bach-Archiv has been part of the University of Leipzig.

== History ==
The Bach-Archiv was founded on the occasion of the bicentennial of Bach's death in 1950 by Werner Neumann, who remained its director until 1973. It served as a central archive for manuscripts and historic documents connected to the composer and a central research center related to him and his family.

At the time of the institution's foundation Leipzig was in East Germany. Prior to German unification there was collaboration with Bach experts in West Germany. For example, the second edition of Bach's complete works, the Neue Bach-Ausgabe, was a joint project between the Bach-Archiv and the Johann-Sebastian-Bach-Institut in Göttingen, West Germany. After unification the Bach-Archiv became part of the Konferenz Nationaler Kultureinrichtungen, a union of more than twenty cultural organizations in the former East Germany which are deemed to be nationally significant. The Göttingen Institute closed in 2006. Since 23 November 2008 the Bach-Archiv has been an institute of the University of Leipzig.

== Location ==
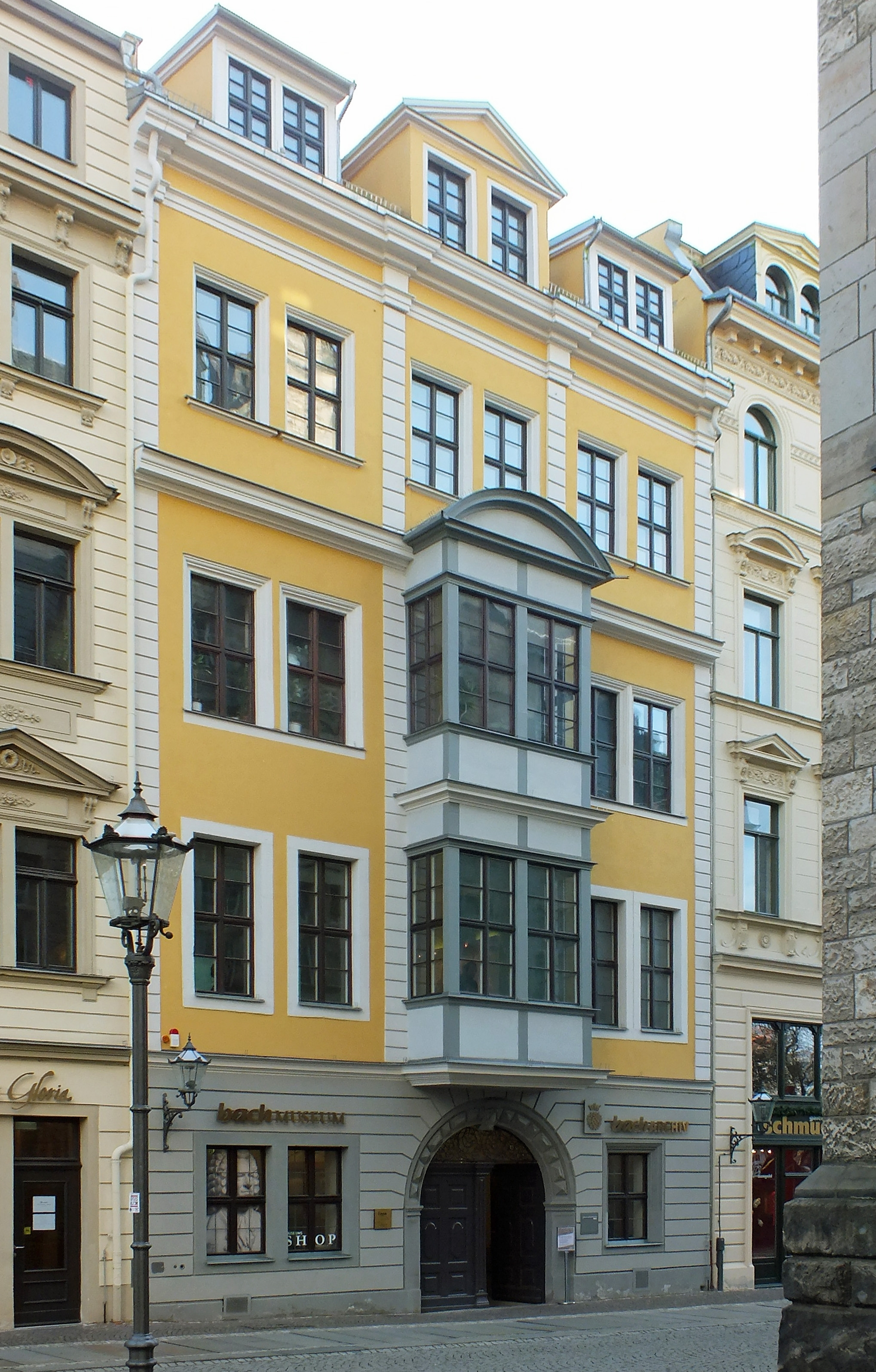
Bach-Museum and Bach-Archiv in the Bosehaus

The Bach Archive moved in 1985 from the Gohlis Palace into the historic Bosehaus opposite the Thomaskirche. The site was restored from 2008 to 2010 to comply with the latest safety requirements, and was opened again on 20 March 2010 by the President of Germany, Horst Köhler. The Neue Bachgesellschaft shares the premises, which also houses a Bach Museum.

== Management ==
Directors:

- 1950–1973: Werner Neumann
- 1974–1979: Hans-Joachim Schulze
- 1979–1991: Werner Felix
- 1992–2000: Hans-Joachim Schulze
- 2001–2013: Christoph Wolff
- As of 2014: Peter Wollny

Presidents (new position as of 2014; Presidents are appointed for a five-year term):

- 2014–2019: Sir John Eliot Gardiner
- As of 2019: Ton Koopman

== Projects ==
Projects with a major participation by the Bach Archive:

- New Bach Edition (critical Urtext edition of all of Johann Sebastian Bach's extant works, published between 1954 and 2007)
- Bach Digital (portal website, launched in 2010, with data and digital facsimiles of compositions by members of the Bach family)
- Online Bach Bibliography (merger, operated since 2012, of the data of the former Bach Bibliography website by Yo Tomita, which had been online since 1997, into the bibliographical data of the Archive, accessible via a web interface)
- jsbach biografie online (multimedia calendar documenting Bach's life story)
- Bach 333 (complete recordings set of Johann Sebastian Bach's works, with detailed documentation, released in 2018)

== Acquisitions ==
In 2021, the Bach Archive acquired Gustav Mahler's Bach edition, 59 of the 61 volumes of the Bach-Gesellschaft-Ausgabe, the first collected edition of Bach's works, with handwritten annotations by Mahler> and his arrangement of the Gavotte from Bach's Orchestral Suite, BWV 1068. The edition had been in private possession, and will become open to musicologists and the public for the first time, as Wollny told the press.

== Relevance ==
Today the Bach-Archiv is a renowned center of Bach research with a scientific library for Bach topics. There is engagement with a wider public via the Bach-Museum and via performances of Bach's music, especially the Bachfest Leipzig (an international festival) and the Internationaler Johann-Sebastian-Bach-Wettbewerb (an international music competition).
