= Evangelische Verlagsanstalt =

German religious publication

The Evangelische Verlagsanstalt (EVA) is a denominational media company founded in Berlin in 1946. Its shareholders are the Gemeinschaftswerk der Evangelischen Publizistik and the Evangelical-Lutheran Church of Saxony. The managing director is Sebastian Knöfel.

== Book publisher ==
The range includes numerous theological-scientific publications, religious education, congregational literature including calendars as well as Christian Belles-lettres with a focus on biographies and stories.

== Newspapers and magazines ==
The EVA publishes, among others, the Theologische Literaturzeitung, the Ökumenische Rundschau, the Berliner Theologische Zeitschrift and the Praxis Gemeindepädagogik (formerly Die Christenlehre).

== Private radio ==
The Evangelische Verlagsanstalt GmbH is a shareholder in commercial broadcasting. In addition, female employees of the Evangelische Verlagsanstalt work as church radio editors in the Saxon broadcasters Hitradio RTL Sachsen and Radio PSR.

== History 1946–1989 ==
Under the licence number 54 of the Soviet Military Administration in Germany, the Evangelische Verlagsanstalt GmbH was founded in 1946 with headquarters in Berlin; in 1953 a publishing department in Leipzig was added. The first publishing director was the later Kirchenrat Friedrich Bartsch.

The first publication, the Christmas Carol book Ihr Kinderlein kommet, was immediately out of print despite a considerable initial print run of 28,000 copies. In the following years, the number of publications rose steadily, so that the publishing house eventually became the largest Protestant publishing house in Germany.

Under the umbrella of the EVA, those private Protestant publishers in the GDR who had not received their own licence also published; the publishing profile was accordingly broad: from scientific theology to congregational literature, Christian fiction to Christian devotional literature and Christian calendars. Some classics are still published today, for example the Kirchliche Amtskalender or the daily abreißkalender Sonne und Schild. Every book had to go through the procedure of censorship in East Germany before it was published: from appraisals by state censors to discussions with the publisher, sometimes lasting months or even years, to state paper allocation.

== History since 1989 ==
With the Peaceful Revolution and the German reunification, the situation of EVA also changed fundamentally. After a change of shareholders, the publishing seat was moved to Leipzig in 1991. With effect from 1 January 2010, Hansisches Druck- und Verlagshaus GmbH Frankfurt (HDV) took over the majority of shares in Evangelische Verlagsanstalt GmbH Leipzig (EVA) from the previous sole shareholder, the Evangelical-Lutheran Church of Saxony (EvLKS). The EvLKS remains a shareholder in the publishing house and is the sole shareholder of Evangelisches Medienhaus GmbH Leipzig, which bundles the publishing activities of the Saxon regional church.

By the time of its 60th anniversary in 2006, around 11,000 titles had been published with a total circulation of around 150 million copies.

The publishing house is an institutional member of the Forum Thomanum.
