= Bach-Jahrbuch =

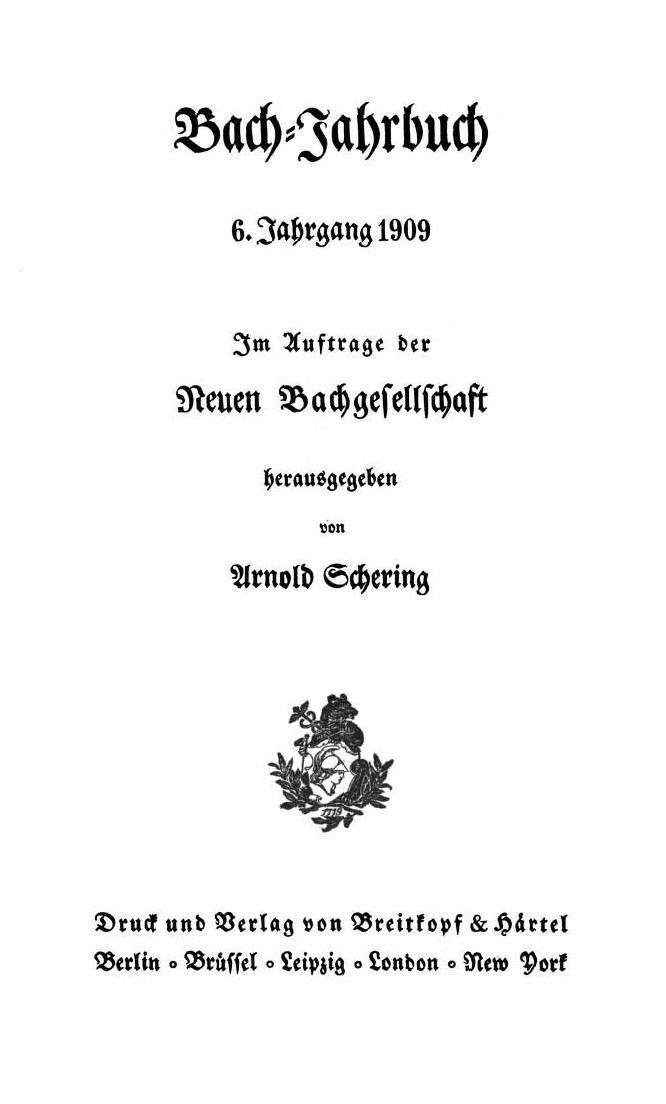
Cover in 1909

The Bach-Jahrbuch ("Bach yearbook" or according to the publication's website "Bach Annals") is an annual publication related to the composer Johann Sebastian Bach. It is published in German by the Neue Bachgesellschaft in Leipzig. It is the most respected publication for international Bach research.

The Bach-Jahrbuch contains contributions of notable Bach scholars related to recent research of Bach and his family. It also provides a Bach bibliography. Begun in 1904, it is the oldest periodical dedicated to one composer.

The first editor was the musicologist Arnold Schering from 1904. The present editor is Peter Wollny.

== Editors ==
- Arnold Schering (1904–1939)
- Max Schneider (1940–1952)
- Alfred Dürr and Werner Neumann (1953–1974)
- Hans-Joachim Schulze and Christoph Wolff (1975–2005)
- Peter Wollny (from 2005)
