= List of compositions by Carl Philipp Emanuel Bach =

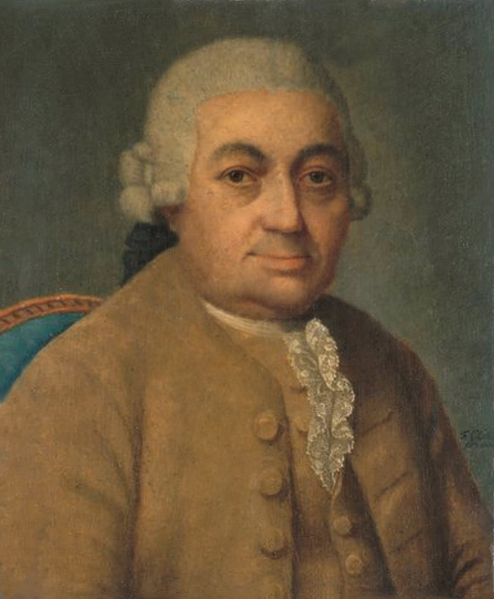
Carl Philipp Emanuel Bach (son of J. S. Bach)

This is a list of compositions by Carl Philipp Emanuel Bach. It is sorted by H. (Helm) numbers, but the corresponding Wq. (Wotquenne) numbers are also shown.

C. P. E. Bach's works have been catalogued in different ways. The first comprehensive catalogue was that by Alfred Wotquenne first published in 1905, and this led to Wq. numbers being used. In 1989, E. Eugene Helm produced a revised catalogue, and H numbers are now also used.

The catalogue assignment numbers listed here conform to an accepted concordance found between Wq. numbers and H. numbers. They do not, however, reflect parallel chronologies in Bach's works. The catalogue of Helm is now the preferred one for the works of C. P. E. Bach. This listing also substantially conforms to the works given by Grove Music Online. The new complete edition of Carl Philipp Emanuel Bach's works surpasses any other earlier organizational efforts in dating and cataloguing the enormous output of C. P. E. Bach.

== Solo keyboard ==
- H. 1. Marches & polonaises for keyboard (BWV Anh. III 122–125)
- H. 1.5. Menuet for keyboard in C major (Wq. 111)
- H. 2. Keyboard Sonata in B♭ major (Wq. 62:1)
- H. 3. Keyboard Sonata in F major (Wq. 65:1)
- H. 4. Keyboard Sonata in A minor (Wq. 65:2)
- H. 5. Keyboard Sonata in D minor (Wq. 65:3)
- H. 6. Keyboard Sonatina in E minor (Wq. 65:4)
- H. 7. Keyboard Sonatina in F major (Wq. 64:1)
- H. 8. Keyboard Sonatina in G major (Wq. 64:2)
- H. 9. Keyboard Sonatina in A minor (Wq. 64:3)
- H. 10. Keyboard Sonatina in E minor (Wq. 64:4)
- H. 11. Keyboard Sonatina in D major (Wq. 64:5)
- H. 12. Keyboard Sonatina in C minor (Wq. 64:6)
- H. 13. Keyboard Sonata in E minor (Wq. 65:5)
- H. 14. Menuet for keyboard in G major (Wq. 118:7)
- H. 15. Keyboard Sonata in G major (Wq. 65:6)
- H. 16. Keyboard Sonata in E♭ major (Wq. 65:7; early version: Solo per il cembalo, BWV Anh. III 129, No. 27 in the second Notebook for Anna Magdalena Bach)
- H. 17. Keyboard Sonata in C major (Wq. 65:8)
- H. 18. Keyboard Sonata in B♭ major (Wq. 65:9)
- H. 19. Keyboard Sonata in A major (Wq. 65:10)
- H. 20. Keyboard Sonata in G major (Wq. 62:2)
- H. 21. Keyboard Sonata in G minor (Wq. 65:11)
- H. 22. Keyboard Sonatina in D major (Wq. 62:3)
- H. 23. Keyboard Sonatina in G major (Wq. 65:12)
- H. 24. Prussian Sonatas (1742) – Keyboard Sonata in F major (Wq. 48:1)
- H. 25. Prussian Sonatas (1742) – Keyboard Sonata in B♭ major (Wq. 48:2)
- H. 26. Prussian Sonatas (1742) – Keyboard Sonata in E major (Wq. 48:3)
- H. 27. Prussian Sonatas (1742) – Keyboard Sonata in C minor (Wq. 48:4)
- H. 28. Prussian Sonatas (1742) – Keyboard Sonata in C major (Wq. 48:5)
- H. 29. Prussian Sonatas (1742) – Keyboard Sonata in A major (Wq. 48:6)
- H. 30. Württemberg Sonatas (1742–1744) – Keyboard Sonata in A minor (Wq. 49:1)
- H. 31. Württemberg Sonatas (1742–1744) – Keyboard Sonata in A♭ major (Wq. 49:2)
- H. 32. Württemberg Sonatas (1742–1744) – Keyboard Sonata in B♭ major (Wq. 49:4)
- H. 33. Württemberg Sonatas (1742–1744) – Keyboard Sonata in E minor (Wq. 49:3)
- H. 34. Württemberg Sonatas (1742–1744) – Keyboard Sonata in E♭ major (Wq. 49:5)
- H. 35. Keyboard Sonata in B minor (Wq. 65:13)
- H. 36. Württemberg Sonatas (1742–1744) – Keyboard Sonata in B minor (Wq. 49:6)
- H. 37. Keyboard Sonata in F♯ minor (Wq. 52:4)
- H. 38. Keyboard Sonata in D minor (Wq. 62:4)
- H. 39. Keyboard Sonata in E major (Wq. 62:5)
- H. 40. Keyboard Sonata in F minor (Wq. 62:6)
- H. 41. Keyboard Sonata in C major (Wq. 62:7)
- H. 42. Keyboard Sonata in D major (Wq. 65:14)
- H. 43. Keyboard Sonata in G major (Wq. 65:15)
- H. 44. Menuet for keyboard in G major (Wq. 118:3)
- H. 45. Sinfonia for keyboard in G major (Wq. 122:1)
- H. 46. Keyboard Sonata in C major (Wq. 65:16)
- H. 47. Keyboard Sonata in G minor (Wq. 65:17)
- H. 48. Keyboard Sonata in F major (Wq. 65:18)
- H. 49. Keyboard Sonata in F major (Wq. 65:19)
- H. 50. Keyboard Sonata in E♭ major (Wq. 52:1)
- H. 51. Keyboard Sonata in B♭ major (Wq. 65:20, 266, 268)
- H. 52. Keyboard Sonata in F major (Wq. 65:21)
- H. 53. Keyboard Sonata in D minor (Wq. 69)
- H. 54. Arioso con variazioni in F major (Wq. 118:4)
- H. 55. Keyboard Sonata in F major (Wq. 62:8)
- H. 56. Keyboard Sonata in G major (Wq. 65:22)
- H. 57. Keyboard Sonata in D minor (Wq. 65:23)
- H. 58. Keyboard Sonata in F major (Wq. 62:9)
- H. 59. Keyboard Sonata in C major (Wq. 62:10)
- H. 60. Keyboard Sonata in D minor (Wq. 65:24)
- H. 61. Keyboard Sonata in A minor (Wq. 65:25)
- H. 62. Keyboard Sonata in G major (Wq. 51:6)
- H. 63. Keyboard Sonata in G major (Wq. 62:11)
- H. 64. Keyboard Sonata in G major (Wq. 65:26)
- H. 65. Allegretto con variazioni in C major (Wq. 118:5)
- H. 66. Keyboard Sonata in E minor (Wq. 62:12)
- H. 67. Keyboard Sonata in D major (Wq. 62:13)
- H. 68. Keyboard Sonata in G minor (Wq. 65:27)
- H. 69. 24 Veränderungen über: Ich schlief (Wq. 118:1)
- H. 70. Keyboard Sonata in C major (Wq. 63:1)
- H. 71. Keyboard Sonata in D minor (Wq. 63:2)
- H. 72. Keyboard Sonata in A major (Wq. 63:3)
- H. 73. Keyboard Sonata in B minor (Wq. 63:4)
- H. 74. Keyboard Sonata in E♭ major (Wq. 63:5)
- H. 75. Keyboard Sonata in F minor (Wq. 63:6)
- H. 76. Duo in contrap. ad 8, 11 & 12 (Wq. 119:1)
- H. 77. Keyboard Sonata in G major (Wq. 62:14)
- H. 78. Keyboard Sonata in E♭ major (Wq. 65:28)
- H. 79. La Borchward for keyboard in G major (Wq. 117:17)
- H. 80. La Pott for keyboard in C major (Wq. 117:18)
- H. 81. La Boehmer for keyboard in D major (Wq. 117:26)
- H. 82. La Gause for keyboard in F major (Wq. 117:37)
- H. 83. Keyboard Sonata in E major (Wq. 65:29)
- H. 84. Organ Sonata in F major (Wq. 70:3)
- H. 85. Organ Sonata in A minor (Wq. 70:4)
- H. 86. Organ Sonata in D major (Wq. 70:5)
- H. 87. Organ Sonata in G minor (Wq. 70:6)
- H. 88. Fugue for organ in G minor (Wq. 112:19, 119:5)
- H. 89. La Gleim for keyboard in A minor (Wq. 117:19)
- H. 90. La Bergius for keyboard in B♭ major (Wq. 117:20)
- H. 91. La Prinzette for keyboard in F major (Wq. 117:21)
- H. 92. L'Hermann for keyboard in G minor (Wq. 117:23)
- H. 93. La Buchholz for keyboard in D minor (Wq. 117:24)
- H. 94. La Stahl for keyboard in D minor (Wq. 117:25)
- H. 95. L'Aly Rupalic* H for keyboard in C major (Wq. 117:27)
- H. 96. La Philippine for keyboard in A major (Wq. 117:34)
- H. 97. La Gabriel for keyboard in C major (Wq. 117:35)
- H. 98. La Caroline for keyboard in A minor (Wq. 117:39)
- H. 99. Fugue for organ in D minor (Wq. 119:2)
- H. 100. Fugue for organ in F major (Wq. 119:3)
- H. 101. Fugue for organ in A major (Wq. 119:4)
- H. 102. Fugue for organ in E♭ major (Wq. 119:6)
- H. 103. Fantasia and fugue for organ in C minor (Wq. 119:7)
- H. 104. Sinfonia for keyboard in F major (Wq. 122:2)
- H. 105. Keyboard Sonata in D minor (Wq. 62:15)
- H. 106. Keyboard Sonata in E minor (Wq. 65:30)
- H. 107. Prelude for organ in D major (Wq. 70:7)
- H. 108. Andantino for keyboard in F major (Wq. 116:18)
- H. 109. La Complaisante for keyboard in B♭ major (Wq. 117:28)
- H. 110. Les Langueurs tendres for keyboard in C minor (Wq. 117:30)
- H. 111. L'Irrésolue for keyboard in G major (Wq. 117:31)
- H. 112. La Journalière for keyboard in C minor (Wq. 117:32)
- H. 113. La Capricieuse for keyboard in E minor (Wq. 117:33)
- H. 114. La Louise for keyboard in D major (Wq. 117:36)
- H. 115. Sinfonia for keyboard in E minor (Wq. 122:3) (lost)
- H. 116. Keyboard Sonata in B♭ major (Wq. 62:16)
- H. 117. Keyboard Sonata in E major (Wq. 62:17)
- H. 118. Keyboard Sonata in G minor (Wq. 62:18)
- H. 119. Keyboard Sonata in G major (Wq. 62:19)
- H. 120. Keyboard Sonata in C major (Wq. 62:20)
- H. 121. Keyboard Sonata in C minor (Wq. 65:31, 266)
- H. 122. L'Auguste for keyboard in F major (Wq. 117:22)
- H. 123. La Xénophon et la Sybille for keyboard in C♯ major (Wq. 117:29)
- H. 124. L'Ernestine for keyboard in D major (Wq. 117:38)
- H. 125. La Sophie for keyboard in B♭ major (Wq. 117:40)
- H. 126. Keyboard Sonata in B♭ major (Wq. 50:5)
- H. 127. Keyboard Sonata in C minor (Wq. 51:3)
- H. 128. Keyboard Sonata in D minor (Wq. 51:4)
- H. 129. Keyboard Sonata in E minor (Wq. 52:6)
- H. 130. Six Keyboard Sonatas (1771) – Keyboard Sonata in F major (Wq. 55:2)
- H. 131. Keyboard Sonata in A minor (Wq. 62:21)
- H. 132. Keyboard Sonata in B minor (Wq. 62:22)
- H. 133. Organ Sonata in A major (Wq. 70:1)
- H. 134. Organ Sonata in B♭ major (Wq. 70:2)
- H. 135. Keyboard Sonata in A major (Wq. 65:32)
- H. 136. Keyboard Sonata in F major (Wq. 50:1)
- H. 137. Keyboard Sonata in G major (Wq. 50:2)
- H. 138. Keyboard Sonata in A minor (Wq. 50:3)
- H. 139. Keyboard Sonata in D minor (Wq. 50:4)
- H. 140. Keyboard Sonata in C minor (Wq. 50:6)
- H. 141. Keyboard Sonata in F major (Wq. 51:5)
- H. 142. Keyboard Sonata in D minor (Wq. 52:2)
- H. 143. Keyboard Sonata in A minor (Wq. 65:33)
- H. 144. Fantasia for keyboard in D major (Wq. 112:2, 117:8)
- H. 145. Solfeggio for keyboard in G major (Wq. 112:4, 117:5)
- H. 146. Fantasia for keyboard in B♭ major (Wq. 112:8, 117:9)
- H. 147. Solfeggio for keyboard in C major (Wq. 112:10, 117:6)
- H. 148. Fantasia for keyboard in F major (Wq. 112:15, 117:10)
- H. 149. Solfeggio for keyboard in G major (Wq. 112:18, 117:7)
- H. 150. Keyboard Sonata in C major (Wq. 51:1)
- H. 151. Keyboard Sonata in B♭ major (Wq. 51:2)
- H. 152. Keyboard Sonata in B♭ major (Wq. 65:34)
- H. 153. Allegro for keyboard in C major (Wq. 116:21)
- H. 154. Polonaise for keyboard in G minor (Wq. 116:22)
- H. 155. Clavierstück mit 22 Veränderungen in A major (Wq. 118:2)
- H. 156. Keyboard Sonata in C major (Wq. 65:35)
- H. 157. Keyboard Sonata in C major (Wq. 65:36)
- H. 158. Keyboard Sonata in G minor (Wq. 52:3)
- H. 159. Menuet for keyboard in C major (Wq. 116:15)
- H. 160. Fantasia for keyboard in D major (Wq. 117:14)
- H. 161. Keyboard Sonata in E major (Wq. 52:5)
- H. 162. Keyboard Sonata in C major (Wq. 53:1)
- H. 163. Keyboard Sonata in C major (Wq. 53:5)
- H. 164. Veränderungen & Auszierungen (Wq. 68)
- H. 165. Menuet for keyboard in D major (Wq. 112:3, 116:9)
- H. 166. Alla polacca for keyboard in A minor (Wq. 112:5, 116:10)
- H. 167. Menuet for keyboard in D major (Wq. 112:9, 116:11)
- H. 168. Alla polacca for keyboard in G minor (Wq. 112:11, 116:12)
- H. 169. Menuet for keyboard in A major (Wq. 112:16, 116:13)
- H. 170. Alla polacca for keyboard in D major (Wq. 112:17, 116:14)
- H. 171. Menuet for keyboard in E♭ major (Wq. 116:1)
- H. 172. Polonaise for keyboard in E♭ major (Wq. 116:2)
- H. 173. Keyboard Sonatas and Rondos (1781) – Keyboard Sonata in F minor (Wq. 57:6)
- H. 174. Keyboard Sonata in A major (Wq. 65:37)
- H. 175. Keyboard Sonata in B♭ major (Wq. 65:38)
- H. 176. Keyboard Sonata in E minor (Wq. 65:39)
- H. 177. Keyboard Sonata in D major (Wq. 65:40)
- H. 178. Keyboard Sonata in C major (Wq. 65:41)
- H. 179. Keyboard Sonata in D minor (Wq. 112:7)
- H. 180. Keyboard Sonata in B♭ major (Wq. 53:2)
- H. 181. Keyboard Sonata in A minor (Wq. 53:3)
- H. 182. Keyboard Sonata in B minor (Wq. 53:4)
- H. 183. Keyboard Sonata in F major (Wq. 53:6)
- H. 184. Keyboard Sonata in D minor (Wq. 54:3)
- H. 185. Keyboard Sonata in D major (Wq. 54:5)
- H. 186. Six Keyboard Sonatas (1771) – Keyboard Sonata in A major (Wq. 55:4)
- H. 187. Six Keyboard Sonatas (1771) – Keyboard Sonata in G major (Wq. 55:6)
- H. 188. Keyboard Sonatas, Free Fantasies, and Rondos (1783) – Keyboard Sonata in E minor (Wq. 58:4)
- H. 189. Keyboard Sonata in E♭ major (Wq. 65:42)
- H. 190. Concerto per il cembalo solo in C major (Wq. 112:1)
- H. 191. Sinfonia for keyboard in G major (Wq. 112:13, 122:4)
- H. 192. Keyboard Sonata in A major (Wq. 65:43)
- H. 193. Allegro for keyboard in G major (Wq. 113:1)
- H. 194. Arioso for keyboard in C major (Wq. 113:2)
- H. 195. Fantasia for keyboard in D minor (Wq. 113:3)
- H. 196. Menuet for keyboard in F major (Wq. 113:4)
- H. 197. Alla polacca for keyboard in A minor (Wq. 113:5)
- H. 198. Allegretto for keyboard in D major (Wq. 113:6)
- H. 199. Alla polacca for keyboard in B minor (Wq. 113:7)
- H. 200. Allegretto for keyboard in A major (Wq. 113:8)
- H. 201. Andante e sostenuto for keyboard in G minor (Wq. 113:9)
- H. 202. Presto for keyboard in B♭ major (Wq. 113:10)
- H. 203. Allegro for keyboard in D minor (Wq. 113:11)
- H. 204. Keyboard Sonata in F major (Wq. 54:1)
- H. 205. Keyboard Sonata in C major (Wq. 54:2)
- H. 206. Keyboard Sonata in B♭ major (Wq. 54:4)
- H. 207. Keyboard Sonata in A major (Wq. 54:6)
- H. 208. Keyboard Sonatas and Rondos (1781) – Keyboard Sonata in D minor (Wq. 57:4)
- H. 209. Keyboard Sonata in C minor (Wq. 60)
- H. 210. Keyboard Sonata in F major (Wq. 62:23)
- H. 211. Keyboard Sonata in C major (Wq. 65:44)
- H. 212. Keyboard Sonata in B♭ major (Wq. 65:45)
- H. 213. Keyboard Sonata in A major (Wq. 65:46)
- H. 214. Menuet for keyboard in D major (Wq. 116:3)
- H. 215. Alla polacca for keyboard in C major (Wq. 116:4)
- H. 216. Menuet for keyboard in C major (Wq. 116:5)
- H. 217. Alla polacca for keyboard in D major (Wq. 116:6)
- H. 218. Menuet for keyboard in F major (Wq. 116:7)
- H. 219. Alla polacca for keyboard in G major (Wq. 116:8)
- H. 220. Solfeggio for keyboard in C minor (Wq. 117:2)
- H. 221. Solfeggio for keyboard in E♭ major (Wq. 117:3)
- H. 222. Solfeggio for keyboard in A major (Wq. 117:4)
- H. 223. Fantasia for keyboard in G major (Wq. 117:11)
- H. 224. Fantasia for keyboard in D minor (Wq. 117:12)
- H. 225. Fantasia for keyboard in G minor (Wq. 117:13)
- H. 226. Romance for keyboard in G major (Wq. 118:6)
- H. 227. Sinfonia for keyboard in F major (Wq. 122:5)
- H. 228. Allegro di molto for keyboard in F major (Wq. 114:1)
- H. 229. Andante e grazioso for keyboard in G minor (Wq. 114:2)
- H. 230. Presto for keyboard in C minor (Wq. 114:3)
- H. 231. Menuet for keyboard in G major (Wq. 114:4)
- H. 232. Alla polacca for keyboard in D major (Wq. 114:5)
- H. 233. Alla polacca for keyboard in E♭ major (Wq. 114:6)
- H. 234. Fantasia for keyboard in D minor (Wq. 114:7, 117:16)
- H. 235. Allegro for keyboard in E major (Wq. 114:8)
- H. 236. Allegretto for keyboard in A major (Wq. 114:9)
- H. 237. Andante for keyboard in C major (Wq. 114:10)
- H. 238. Poco allegro for keyboard in E minor (Wq. 114:11)
- H. 239. Polonaise for keyboard in G major
- H. 240. Keyboard Sonata in F major (Wq. 62:24)
- H. 241. Clavierstück für die rechte oder linke Hand (Wq. 117:1)
- H. 242. Concerto per il cembalo solo (arrangement of H. 470)
- H. 243. Six Keyboard Sonatas (1771) – Keyboard Sonata in F major (Wq. 55:5)
- H. 244. Six Keyboard Sonatas (1771) – Keyboard Sonata in C major (Wq. 55:1)
- H. 245. Six Keyboard Sonatas (1771) – Keyboard Sonata in B minor (Wq. 55:3)
- H. 246. Keyboard Sonatas and Rondos (1780) – Keyboard Sonata in G major (Wq. 56:2)
- H. 247. Keyboard Sonatas and Rondos (1781) – Keyboard Sonata in A minor (Wq. 57:2)
- H. 248. Keyboard Sonata in C major (Wq. 65:47)
- H. 249. Leichtes Clavier-Stück in C major (Wq. 116:23)
- H. 250. Leichtes Clavier-Stück in F major (Wq. 116:24)
- H. 251. Leichtes Clavier-Stück in D major (Wq. 116:25)
- H. 252. Leichtes Clavier-Stück in G major (Wq. 116:26)
- H. 253. Leichtes Clavier-Stück in B♭ major (Wq. 116:27)
- H. 254. Leichtes Clavier-Stück in D major (Wq. 116:28)
- H. 255. Allegro for keyboard in D major
- H. 256. Allegro for keyboard in F major
- H. 257. Allegretto for keyboard in D major
- H. 258. Menuet for keyboard in F major
- H. 259. Variationen mit veränderten Reprisen (Wq. 118:10)
- H. 260. Keyboard Sonatas and Rondos (1780) – Rondo for keyboard in C major (Wq. 56:1)
- H. 261. Keyboard Sonatas and Rondos (1780) – Rondo for keyboard in D major (Wq. 56:3)
- H. 262. Keyboard Sonatas and Rondos (1780) – Rondo for keyboard in A minor (Wq. 56:5)
- H. 263. 12 Variationen über die Folie d'Espagne (Wq. 118:9)
- H. 264. 75 Cadenzas for Concerti (Wq. 120)
- H. 265. Keyboard Sonatas and Rondos (1781) – Rondo for keyboard in E major (Wq. 57:1)
- H. 266. Keyboard Sonatas and Rondos (1781) – Rondo for keyboard in F major (Wq. 57:5)
- H. 267. Keyboard Sonatas, Free Fantasies, and Rondos (1783) – Rondo for keyboard in B♭ major (Wq. 58:5)
- H. 268. Keyboard Sonatas, Free Fantasies, and Rondos (1785) – Rondo for keyboard in G major (Wq. 59:2)
- H. 269. Keyboard Sonatas and Rondos (1780) – Keyboard Sonata in F major (Wq. 56:4)
- H. 270. Keyboard Sonatas and Rondos (1780) – Keyboard Sonata in A major (Wq. 56:6)
- H. 271. Keyboard Sonatas and Rondos (1781) – Rondo for keyboard in G major (Wq. 57:3)
- H. 272. Rondo for keyboard in E minor (Wq. 66)
- H. 273. Keyboard Sonatas, Free Fantasies, and Rondos (1783) – Keyboard Sonata in G major (Wq. 58:2)
- H. 274. Keyboard Sonatas, Free Fantasies, and Rondos (1783) – Rondo for keyboard in E major (Wq. 58:3)
- H. 275. Canzonetta der Herzogin von Gotha (Wq. 118:8)
- H. 276. Keyboard Sonatas, Free Fantasies, and Rondos (1783) – Rondo for keyboard in A major (Wq. 58:1)
- H. 277. Keyboard Sonatas, Free Fantasies, and Rondos (1783) – Fantasia for keyboard in E♭ major (Wq. 58:6)
- H. 278. Keyboard Sonatas, Free Fantasies, and Rondos (1783) – Fantasia for keyboard in A major (Wq. 58:7)
- H. 279. Keyboard Sonatas, Free Fantasies, and Rondos (1785) – Fantasia for keyboard in F major (Wq. 59:5)
- H. 280. Keyboard Sonata in G major (Wq. 65:48)
- H. 281. Keyboard Sonatas, Free Fantasies, and Rondos (1785) – Keyboard Sonata in E minor (Wq. 59:1)
- H. 282. Keyboard Sonatas, Free Fantasies, and Rondos (1785) – Keyboard Sonata in B♭ major (Wq. 59:3)
- H. 283. Keyboard Sonatas, Free Fantasies, and Rondos (1785) – Rondo for keyboard in C minor (Wq. 59:4)
- H. 284. Keyboard Sonatas, Free Fantasies, and Rondos (1785) – Fantasia for keyboard in C major (Wq. 59:6)
- H. 285. Fughetta on "C–F–E–B–A–C–H" in F major
- H. 286. Keyboard Sonatas, Free Fantasies, and Rondos (1787) – Keyboard Sonata in D major (Wq. 61:2)
- H. 287. Keyboard Sonatas, Free Fantasies, and Rondos (1787) – Keyboard Sonata in E minor (Wq. 61:5)
- H. 288. Keyboard Sonatas, Free Fantasies, and Rondos (1787) – Rondo for keyboard in E♭ major (Wq. 61:1)
- H. 289. Keyboard Sonatas, Free Fantasies, and Rondos (1787) – Fantasia for keyboard in B♭ major (Wq. 61:3)
- H. 290. Keyboard Sonatas, Free Fantasies, and Rondos (1787) – Rondo for keyboard in D minor (Wq. 61:4)
- H. 291. Keyboard Sonatas, Free Fantasies, and Rondos (1787) – Fantasia for keyboard in C major (Wq. 61:6)
- H. 292. Keyboard Sonatina in G major (Wq. 63:7)
- H. 293. Keyboard Sonatina in E major (Wq. 63:8)
- H. 294. Keyboard Sonatina in D major (Wq. 63:9)
- H. 295. Keyboard Sonatina in B♭ major (Wq. 63:10)
- H. 296. Keyboard Sonatina in F major (Wq. 63:11)
- H. 297. Keyboard Sonatina in D minor (Wq. 63:12)
- H. 298. Keyboard Sonata in E♭ major (Wq. 65:49)
- H. 299. Keyboard Sonata in G major (Wq. 65:50)
- H. 300. Fantasia for keyboard in F♯ minor (Wq. 67)
- H. 301. Allegretto for keyboard in F major (Wq. 116:19)
- H. 302. Allegro for keyboard in D major (Wq. 116:20)
- H. 303. Menuet for keyboard in G major (Wq. 116:29)
- H. 304. Menuet for keyboard in G major (Wq. 116:30)
- H. 305. Menuet for keyboard in G major (Wq. 116:31)
- H. 306. Menuet for keyboard in F major (Wq. 116:32)
- H. 307. Menuet for keyboard in D major (Wq. 116:33)
- H. 308. Polonaise for keyboard in A major (Wq. 116:34)
- H. 309. Menuet for keyboard in D major (Wq. 116:35)
- H. 310. Allegro di molto for keyboard in A major (Wq. 116:36)
- H. 311. Allegro for keyboard in E major (Wq. 116:37)
- H. 312. Allegro for keyboard in B♭ major (Wq. 116:38)
- H. 313. Presto for keyboard in A minor (Wq. 116:39)
- H. 314. Menuet for keyboard in D major (Wq. 116:40)
- H. 315. Polonaise for keyboard in F major (Wq. 116:41)
- H. 316. Polonaise for keyboard in A major (Wq. 116:42)
- H. 317. Polonaise for keyboard in B♭ major (Wq. 116:43)
- H. 318. Polonaise for keyboard in E♭ major (Wq. 116:44)
- H. 319. March for keyboard in F major (Wq. 116:45)
- H. 320. March for keyboard in D major (Wq. 116:46)
- H. 321. Menuet for keyboard in C major (Wq. 116:47)
- H. 322. Menuet for keyboard in G major (Wq. 116:48)
- H. 323. Polonaise for keyboard in D major (Wq. 116:49)
- H. 324. Langsam und traurig for keyboard in A minor (Wq. 116:50)
- H. 325. Allegro for keyboard in C major (Wq. 116:51)
- H. 326. Allegro ma non troppo for keyboard in E♭ major (Wq. 116:52)
- H. 327. Allegro for keyboard in C major (Wq. 116:53)
- H. 328. Allegro for keyboard in G major (Wq. 116:54)
- H. 329. Allegro for keyboard in E♭ major (Wq. 116:55)
- H. 330. Allegro for keyboard in D major (Wq. 116:56)
- H. 331. Allegretto grazioso for keyboard in C major (Wq. 116:57)
- H. 332. Keyboard Sonata in D major
- H. 333. La Juliane for keyboard in F major
- H. 334. Variations for keyboard in C major
- H. 335. Adagio per il organo a 2 claviere e pedal in D minor
- H. 336. 5 Choräle mit Mittelstimmen for keyboard
- H. 337. Chorale for keyboard in F major
- H. 338. 2 Allegros for keyboard
- H. 339. Fantasia for keyboard in E♭ major
- H. 340. Keyboard Sonata in D major
- H. 341. Keyboard Sonata in E minor
- H. 342. Sinfonia for keyboard in B♭ major
- H. 343. Keyboard Sonata in C major
- H. 344. Keyboard Sonata in C minor
- H. 345. Keyboard Sonata in F major
- H. 346. Keyboard Sonata in D major
- H. 347. Keyboard Sonata in E♭ major
- H. 348. Keyboard Fantasia in E♭ major
- H. 349. Keyboard Sonata in C minor
- H. 350. Keyboard Sonata in B♭ major
- H. 351. Keyboard Sonata in F minor
- H. 352. Keyboard Sonata in B♭ major
- H. 353. Keyboard Sonata in C major
- H. 354. Keyboard Sonata in F major
- H. 355. Keyboard Sonata in G major
- H. 356. Keyboard Sonata in G major
- H. 357. Keyboard Sonata in A minor
- H. 358. Keyboard Sonata in B♭ major
- H. 359. Fantasia and fugue for keyboard in E minor
- H. 360. Fugue for keyboard in C major
- H. 361. Arioso con variazioni for keyboard in A major
- H. 362. Alla polacca con variatio for keyboard in G major
- H. 363. Giga con variazioni for keyboard in F major
- H. 364. Menuet for keyboard in D major
- H. 365. Menuetten zum Tantzen for keyboard in D major
- H. 366. Polonaise for keyboard in D major
- H. 367. Polonaise for keyboard in D major
- H. 368. Polonaise for keyboard in A major
- H. 369. 5 pieces for keyboard
- H. 370. La Walhauer for keyboard in A major
- H. 371. Chorale for keyboard in B♭ major
- H. 371.5. Andante e Allabreve for keyboard
- H. 371.6. Andante for keyboard in C minor
- H. 371.7. Arietta con variationes for keyboard in D major
- H. 371.8. Fantasia for keyboard in E minor
- H. 371.9. Sonata di Preludio e Fuga for keyboard in F major
- H. 372. 6 Keyboard Sonatas
- H. 372.5. Fugue for organ in D minor
- H. 373. Keyboard Sonata in F major (H. 373)
- H. 373.5. 3 Fugette for keyboard
- H. 374. Fugue for keyboard in B♭ major
- H. 375. Polonaise for keyboard in E♭ major
- H. 375.5. 2 Menuets for keyboard in F major
- H. 376. Keyboard Sonata in C major
- H. 377. 2 Keyboard Sonatas
- H. 378. Keyboard Sonata in A major
- H. 379. Keyboard Sonata in A major
- H. 380. 2 Keyboard Sonatas
- H. 381. Keyboard Sonata in C major (Wq. 272)
- H. 382. A favorite overture of Sig. Bach of Berlin
- H. 383. Keyboard Sonata in E minor
- H. 384. Parthia for keyboard in C major
- H. 385. Le travagant for keyboard in G major
- H. 386. Le caressant – Le contente for keyboard in A minor
- H. 387. Le petit maître for keyboard in F major
- H. 388. Le flegmatique en colère for keyboard in G minor
- H. 389. Le moribant for keyboard in D minor
- H. 390. Il est vive for keyboard in D major
- H. 390.5. Giga for keyboard in B♭ major
- H. 391. Andante e Allegro for keyboard
- H. 392. Fugue for keyboard in C major (BWV Anh.90)
- H. 393. Fugue for keyboard in C minor (BWV 575)
- H. 394. Fuga sopra il nome de Bach in C major
- H. 395. Chorale for keyboard in G major
- H. 396. Chorale for keyboard in D minor
- H. 397. Vivace for keyboard in C minor
- H. 398. Menuet for keyboard in E♭ major
- H. 399. Tempo di menuetto for keyboard in A major
- H. 400. Exercise for keyboard in A major
- H. 401. Exercise for keyboard in A minor
- H. 402. Piece for keyboard in A minor (fragment)

== Concertos ==
- H. 403. Keyboard Concerto in A minor (Wq. 1) (1733) (also attributed to Johann Sebastian Bach as BWV Anh.189)
- H. 404. Keyboard Concerto in E♭ major (Wq. 2) (1734)
- H. 405. Keyboard Concerto in G major (Wq. 3) (1737)
- H. 406. Keyboard Concerto in G major (Wq. 4) (1738)
- H. 407. Keyboard Concerto in C minor (Wq. 5) (1739)
- H. 408. Concerto for 2 harpsichords in F major (Wq. 46) (1740)
- H. 409. Keyboard Concerto in G minor (Wq. 6) (1740)
- H. 410. Keyboard Concerto in A major (Wq. 7) (1740)
- H. 411. Keyboard Concerto in A major (Wq. 8) (1741)
- H. 412. Keyboard Concerto in G major (Wq. 9) (1742)
- H. 413. Keyboard Concerto in B♭ major (Wq. 10) (1742)
- H. 414. Keyboard Concerto in D major (Wq. 11) (1743)
- H. 415. Keyboard Concerto in F major (Wq. 12) (1744)
- H. 416. Keyboard Concerto in D major (Wq. 13) (1744)
- H. 417. Keyboard Concerto in E major (Wq. 14) (1744)
- H. 418. Keyboard Concerto in E minor (Wq. 15) (1745)
- H. 419. Keyboard Concerto in G major (Wq. 16) (1745)
- H. 420. Keyboard Concerto in D minor (Wq. 17) (1745)
- H. 421. Keyboard Concerto in D major (Wq. 18) (1745)
- H. 422. Keyboard Concerto in A major (Wq. 19) (1746)
- H. 423. Keyboard Concerto in C major (Wq. 20) (1746)
- H. 424. Keyboard Concerto in A minor (Wq. 21) (1747)
- H. 425. Keyboard Concerto in D minor (Wq. 22) (1747)
- H. 427. Keyboard Concerto in D minor (Wq. 23) (1748)
- H. 428. Keyboard Concerto in E minor (Wq. 24) (1748)
- H. 429. Keyboard Concerto in B♭ major (Wq. 25) (1749)
- H. 430. Keyboard Concerto in A minor (Wq. 26) (1750)
  - H. 431. Flute Concerto in A minor (Wq. 166) (1750) (arrangement of H.430)
  - H. 432. Cello Concerto in A minor (Wq. 170) (1750) (arrangement of H.430)
- H. 433. Keyboard Concerto in D major (Wq. 27) (1750)
- H. 434. Keyboard Concerto in B♭ major (Wq. 28) (1751)
  - H. 435. Flute Concerto in B♭ major (Wq. 167) (1751) (arrangement of H.434)
  - H. 436. Cello Concerto in B♭ major (Wq. 171) (1751) (arrangement of H.434)
- H. 437. Keyboard Concerto in A major (Wq. 29) (1753)
  - H. 438. Flute Concerto in A major (Wq. 168) (1753) (arrangement of H.437)
  - H. 439. Cello Concerto in A major (Wq. 172) (1753) (arrangement of H.437)
- H. 440. Keyboard Concerto in B minor (Wq. 30) (1753)
- H. 441. Keyboard Concerto in C minor (Wq. 31) (1753)
- H. 442. Keyboard Concerto in G minor (Wq. 32) (1754)
- H. 443. Keyboard Concerto in F major (Wq. 33) (1755)
- H. 444. Keyboard Concerto in G major (Wq. 34) (1755)
  - H. 445. Flute Concerto in G major (Wq. 169) (1755) (arrangement of H.444)
- H. 446. Keyboard Concerto in E♭ major (Wq. 35) (1759)
- H. 447. Keyboard Concerto in B♭ major (Wq. 36) (1762)
- H. 448. Keyboard Concerto in C minor (Wq. 37) (1762)
- H. 449. Sonatina for keyboard & orchestra in D major (Wq. 96) (1762)
- H. 450. Sonatina for keyboard & orchestra in G major (Wq. 97) (1762)
- H. 451. Sonatina for keyboard & orchestra in G major (Wq. 98) (1762)
- H. 452. Sonatina for keyboard & orchestra in F major (Wq. 99) (1762)
- H. 453. Sonatina for 2 harpsichords & orchestra in D minor (Wq. 109) (1762)
- H. 454. Keyboard Concerto in F major (Wq. 38) (1763)
- H. 455. Sonatina for keyboard & orchestra in E major (Wq. 100) (1763)
- H. 456. Sonatina for keyboard & orchestra in D major (Wq. 102) (1763)
- H. 457. Sonatina for keyboard & orchestra in C major (Wq. 103) (1763)
- H. 458. Sonatina for keyboard & orchestra in C major (Wq. 106) (1763)
- H. 459. Sonatina for keyboard & orchestra in B♭ major (Wq. 110) (1763)
- H. 460. Sonatina for keyboard & orchestra in C major (Wq. 101) (1763+) (2nd version of H.458)
- H. 461. Sonatina for keyboard & orchestra in D minor / F major (Wq. 107) (1764)
- H. 462. Sonatina for keyboard & orchestra in E♭ major (Wq. 108) (1764–65)
- H. 463. Sonatina for keyboard & orchestra in D minor / F major (Wq. 104) (1764+) (2nd version of H.461)
- H. 464. Sonatina for keyboard & orchestra in E♭ major (Wq. 105) (1764+) (2nd version of H.462)
- H. 465. Keyboard Concerto in B♭ major (Wq. 39) (1765)
  - H. 466. Oboe Concerto in B♭ major (Wq. 164) (1765) (arrangement of H.465)
- H. 467. Keyboard Concerto in E♭ major (Wq. 40) (1765)
  - H. 468. Oboe Concerto in E♭ major (Wq. 165) (1765) (arrangement of H.467)
- H. 469. Keyboard Concerto in E♭ major (Wq. 41) (1769)
- H. 470. Keyboard Concerto in F major (Wq. 42) (1770)
- H. 471. Keyboard Concerto in F major (Wq. 43:1) (1771)
- H. 472. Keyboard Concerto in D major (Wq. 43:2) (1771)
- H. 473. Keyboard Concerto in E♭ major (Wq. 43:3) (1771)
- H. 474. Keyboard Concerto in C minor (Wq. 43:4) (1771)
- H. 475. Keyboard Concerto in G major (Wq. 43:5) (1771)
- H. 476. Keyboard Concerto in C major (Wq. 43:6) (1771)
- H. 477. Keyboard Concerto in G major (Wq. 44) (1778)
- H. 478. Keyboard Concerto in D major (Wq. 45) (1778)
- H. 479. Concerto doppio for harpsichord & piano in E♭ major (Wq. 47) (1788)

=== Inauthentic works ===
- H. 480. Sonata for keyboard & orchestra in D major (1762) (CPE Bach's authorship doubtful, version of H.453)
- H. 481. Sonatina for keyboard & orchestra in D major (CPE Bach's authorship doubtful)
- H. 482. 11 Flute Concertos (lost, CPE Bach's authorship doubtful)
- H. 483. Keyboard Concerto in B♭ major (lost, CPE Bach's authorship doubtful)
- H. 484/1. Flute Concerto in D minor (1747) (CPE Bach's authorship doubtful, arrangement of H.425)
- H. 485. Keyboard Concerto in E minor (CPE Bach's authorship doubtful, arrangement of H.452)
- H. 486. Keyboard Concerto in F minor (CPE Bach's authorship doubtful)
- H. 487. Keyboard Concerto in D minor (1759) (spurious; composed by Christoph Nichelmann)
- H. 488. Keyboard Concerto in B♭ major (1763) (spurious; composed by Johann Christian Bach W.C49)
- H. 489. Keyboard Concerto in G major (1763) (spurious; composed by Johann Christian Bach W.C52)
- H. 490. Keyboard Concerto in A minor (1768) (spurious; composed by Johann Christoph Friedrich Bach BR-JCFB C 30)
- H. 491. Keyboard Concerto in C major (spurious)
- H. 492. Sonatina a harmonica & orchestra in A minor (spurious)
- H. 493. Keyboard Concerto in E♭ major (spurious)
- H. 493.5. Keyboard Concerto in F major (spurious)
- H. 494. Keyboard Concerto in B♭ major (spurious)
- H. 495. Keyboard Concerto in E♭ major (spurious)
- H. 496. Keyboard Concerto in B minor (spurious)
- H. 497. Keyboard Concerto in B♭ major (spurious)
- H. 498. Keyboard Concerto in C major (spurious)
- H. 499. Keyboard Concerto in B minor (spurious)
- H. 500. Keyboard Concerto in F major (spurious)
- H. 501. Harpsichord Concerto in D major (spurious)

== Chamber music ==
- H. 502. Violin Sonata in D major (Wq. 71)
- H. 503. Violin Sonata in D minor (Wq. 72)
- H. 504. Violin Sonata in C major (Wq. 73)
- H. 505. Flute Sonata in D major (Wq. 83)
- H. 506. Flute Sonata in E major (Wq. 84)
- H. 507. Violin Sonata in D major (Wq. 74)
- H. 508. Flute Sonata in G major (Wq. 85)
- H. 509. Flute Sonata in G major (Wq. 86)
- H. 510. Viola da gamba Sonata in G minor (Wq. 88)
- H. 511. Violin Sonata in F major (Wq. 75)
- H. 512. Violin Sonata in B minor (Wq. 76)
- H. 513. Violin Sonata in B♭ major (Wq. 77)
- H. 514. Violin Sonata in C minor (Wq. 78)
- H. 515. Flute Sonata in C major (Wq. 87)
- H. 516. Clarinet Sonata in E♭ major (Wq. 92:1)
- H. 517. Clarinet Sonata in E♭ major (Wq. 92:2)
- H. 518. Clarinet Sonata in E♭ major (Wq. 92:3)
- H. 519. Clarinet Sonata in B♭ major (Wq. 92:4)
- H. 520. Clarinet Sonata in E♭ major (Wq. 92:5)
- H. 521. Clarinet Sonata in B♭ major (Wq. 92:6)
- H. 522. Piano Trio in A minor (Wq. 90:1)
- H. 523. Piano Trio in G major (Wq. 90:2)
- H. 524. Piano Trio in C major (Wq. 90:3)
- H. 525. Piano Trio in B♭ major (Wq. 89:1)
- H. 526. Piano Trio in C major (Wq. 89:2)
- H. 527. Piano Trio in A major (Wq. 89:3)
- H. 528. Piano Trio in E♭ major (Wq. 89:4)
- H. 529. Piano Trio in E minor (Wq. 89:5)
- H. 530. Piano Trio in D major (Wq. 89:6)
- H. 531. Piano Trio in E minor (Wq. 91:1)
- H. 532. Piano Trio in D major (Wq. 91:2)
- H. 533. Piano Trio in F major (Wq. 91:3)
- H. 534. Piano Trio in C major (Wq. 91:4)
- H. 535. Arioso con variazioni in A major (Wq. 79)
- H. 536. Fantasia in F♯ minor (Wq. 80)
- H. 537. Quartet for flute & piano trio in A minor (Wq. 93)
- H. 538. Quartet for flute & piano trio in D major (Wq. 94)
- H. 539. Quartet for flute & piano trio in G major (Wq. 95)
- H. 540. Sonata for 1 instrument & keyboard in E minor (fragment)
- H. 541. Viola Sonata in G major (lost)
- H. 542. Violin Sonata in A major
- H. 542.5. Flute Sonata in G minor (BWV 1020)
- H. 543. Flute Sonata in B♭ major
- H. 544. Violin Sonata in E major
- H. 545. Flute Sonata in E♭ major (BWV 1031)
- H. 546. Violin Sonata in C major
- H. 547. Violin Sonata in G major
- H. 548. Flute Sonata in G major (Wq. 134)
- H. 549. Oboe Sonata in G minor (Wq. 135)
- H. 550. Flute Sonata in G major (Wq. 123)
- H. 551. Flute Sonata in E minor (Wq. 124)
- H. 552. Flute Sonata in B♭ major (Wq. 125)
- H. 553. Flute Sonata in D major (Wq. 126)
- H. 554. Flute Sonata in G major (Wq. 127)
- H. 555. Flute Sonata in A minor (Wq. 128)
- H. 556. Flute Sonata in D major (Wq. 129)
- H. 557. Cello Sonata in G minor (Wq. 138) (lost)
- H. 558. Viola da gamba Sonata in C major (Wq. 136)
- H. 559. Viola da gamba Sonata in D major (Wq. 137)
- H. 560. Flute Sonata in B♭ major (Wq. 130)
- H. 561. Flute Sonata in D major (Wq. 131)
- H. 562. Sonata in A minor for Solo Flute (Wq. 132)
- H. 563. Harp Sonata in G major (Wq. 139)
- H. 564. Flute Sonata in G major (Wq. 133)
- H. 565. 2 Flute Sonatas
- H. 566. Trio mit J.S. Bach (lost)
- H. 567. Trio Sonata in B minor (Wq. 143)
- H. 568. Trio Sonata in G major (Wq. 144)
- H. 569. Trio Sonata in D minor (Wq. 145)
- H. 570. Trio Sonata in A major (Wq. 146)
- H. 571. Trio Sonata in C major (Wq. 147)
- H. 572. Trio Sonata in A minor (Wq. 148)
- H. 573. Trio Sonata in C major (Wq. 149)
- H. 574. Trio Sonata in G major (Wq. 150)
- H. 575. Trio Sonata in D major (Wq. 151)
- H. 576. Trio Sonata in F major (Wq. 154; BWV Anh. 186)
- H. 577. Trio Sonata in E minor (Wq. 155)
- H. 578. Trio Sonata in B♭ major (Wq. 161:2)
  Trio Sonata in B♭ major, Wq.161/2 (H.578)
- H. 579. Trio Sonata in C minor (Wq. 161:1)
- H. 580. Trio Sonata in E major (Wq. 162)
- H. 581. Trio Sonata in G major (Wq. 152)
- H. 582. Trio Sonata in A minor (Wq. 156)
- H. 583. Trio Sonata in G major (Wq. 157)
- H. 584. Trio Sonata in B♭ major (Wq. 158)
- H. 585. Sinfonia a tre voce in D major
- H. 586. Trio Sonata in G major (Wq. 153)
- H. 587. Trio Sonata in B♭ major (Wq. 159)
- H. 588. Trio Sonata in F major (Wq. 163)
- H. 589. Trio Sonata in F major
- H. 590. Trio Sonata in D minor (Wq. 160)
- H. 591. Trio Sonata in E major
- H. 592. Trio Sonata in C minor
- H. 593. Trio Sonata in E♭ major (lost)
- H. 594. Trio Sonata in F major (lost)
- H. 595. Trio Sonata in G major (lost)
- H. 596. Trio Sonata in F major
- H. 597. Trio Sonata in F major
- H. 598. Duet for flute and violin in G major (Wq. 140)
- H. 599. Duet for violins in D minor (Wq. 141) (lost)
- H. 600. Twelve pieces in 2 or 3 parts (Wq. 81)
- H. 601. 2 Menuets in C major (Wq. 192)
- H. 602. Menuet in D major (Wq. 189:1)
- H. 603. Menuet in D major (Wq. 189:2)
- H. 604. Polonaise in D major (Wq. 190:1)
- H. 605. Polonaise in A minor (Wq. 190:3)
- H. 606. Menuet in D major (Wq. 189:8)
- H. 607. Polonaise in G major (Wq. 190:2)
- H. 608. Polonaise in D major (Wq. 190:4)
- H. 609. Polonaise in C major (Wq. 190:5)
- H. 610. Duet for harpsichords in B♭ major (Wq. 115:1)
- H. 611. Duet for harpsichords in F major (Wq. 115:2)
- H. 612. Duet for harpsichords in A minor (Wq. 115:3)
- H. 613. Duet for harpsichords in E♭ major (Wq. 115:4)
- H. 614. March for winds in D major (Wq. 185:1)
- H. 615. March for winds in C major (Wq. 185:2)
- H. 616. March for winds in F major (Wq. 185:3)
- H. 617. March for winds in G major (Wq. 185:4)
- H. 618. March for winds in E♭ major (Wq. 185:5)
- H. 619. March for winds in D major (Wq. 185:6)
- H. 620. 2 kleine Stücke for winds (Wq. 186) (lost)
- H. 621. Marcia für die Arche in C major (Wq. 188)
- H. 622. Menuet in G major (Wq. 189:3)
- H. 623. Menuet in G major (Wq. 189:4)
- H. 624. Menuet in G major (Wq. 189:5)
- H. 625. Menuet in F major (Wq. 189:6)
- H. 626. Menuet in D major (Wq. 189:7)
- H. 627. Polonaise in A major (Wq. 190:6)
- H. 628. Twelve pieces in 2 or 3 parts (Wq. 82)
- H. 629. Sonata for winds in D major (Wq. 184:1)
- H. 630. Sonata for winds in F major (Wq. 184:2)
- H. 631. Sonata for winds in G major (Wq. 184:3)
- H. 632. Sonata for winds in E♭ major (Wq. 184:4)
- H. 633. Sonata for winds in A major (Wq. 184:5)
- H. 634. Sonata for winds in C major (Wq. 184:6)
- H. 635. 30 Stücke für Spieluhren auch Drehorgeln (Wq. 193)
- H. 636. Duet for clarinets in C major (Wq. 142)
- H. 637. 2 Marches for winds (Wq. 187)
- H. 638. 2 abwechselnde stark besetzte Menuetten (Wq. 191)
- H. 639. Fantasia sopra Jesu meines Lebens Leben
- H. 640. 3 Sonatas for flute & violin
- H. 641. Divertimento in D major
- H. 642. Divertimento in G major
- H. 643. Sonata for glass harmonica & cello in C major
- H. 644. 3 Trio Sonatas
- H. 645. Quintet in C major
- H. 646. Frühlings Erwachen for 2 violins & keyboard

== Symphonies ==
- H. 647. Adagio for string orchestra in B minor (spurious, by Henri Casadesus)
- H. 648. Symphony in G major (Wq. 173)
- H. 649. Symphony in C major (Wq. 174)
- H. 650. Symphony in F major (Wq. 175)
- H. 651. Symphony in D major (Wq. 176)
- H. 652. Symphony in E minor (Wq. 177) (first version of H. 653)
- H. 653. Symphony in E minor (Wq. 178)
- H. 654. Symphony in E♭ major (Wq. 179)
- H. 655. Symphony in G major (Wq. 180)
- H. 656. Symphony in F major (Wq. 181)
- H. 657. Six Symphonies for Baron van Swieten (1773) – Hamburger Sinfonien – Symphony in G major for string orchestra (Wq. 182:1)
- H. 658. Six Symphonies for Baron van Swieten (1773) – Hamburger Sinfonien – Symphony in B♭ major for string orchestra (Wq. 182:2)
- H. 659. Six Symphonies for Baron van Swieten (1773) – Hamburger Sinfonien – Symphony in C major for string orchestra (Wq. 182:3)
- H. 660. Six Symphonies for Baron van Swieten (1773) – Hamburger Sinfonien – Symphony in A major for string orchestra (Wq. 182:4)
- H. 661. Six Symphonies for Baron van Swieten (1773) – Hamburger Sinfonien – Symphony in B minor for string orchestra (Wq. 182:5)
- H. 662. Six Symphonies for Baron van Swieten (1773) – Hamburger Sinfonien – Symphony in E major for string orchestra (Wq. 182:6)
- H. 663. Orchester-Sinfonien mit zwölf obligaten Stimmen (1775–76) – Symphony in D major (Wq. 183:1)
- H. 664. Orchester-Sinfonien mit zwölf obligaten Stimmen (1775–76) – Symphony in E♭ major (Wq. 183:2)
- H. 665. Orchester-Sinfonien mit zwölf obligaten Stimmen (1775–76) – Symphony in F major (Wq. 183:3)
- H. 666. Orchester-Sinfonien mit zwölf obligaten Stimmen (1775–76) – Symphony in G major (Wq. 183:4)
- H. 667. Symphony in G major
- H. 668. Symphonies & divertimentos by J.C. Bach

== Songs and arias ==
- H. 669. 3 Arias for tenor (Wq. 211)
- H. 670. Schäferlied in G major (Wq. 199:2)
- H. 671. Der Zufriedne in D major (Wq. 199:10)
- H. 672. Die verliebte Verzweifelung in C minor (Wq. 199:12)
- H. 673. Die Küsse in B♭ major (Wq. 199:4)
- H. 674. Trinklied in F major (Wq. 199:5)
- H. 675. Amint in G major (Wq. 199:11)
- H. 676. Die märkische Helene in D major (Wq. 199:14)
- H. 677. Die sächsische Helene in D major (Wq. 199:1)
- H. 678. Dorinde in C major (Wq. 199:7)
- H. 679. Lied eines jungen Mädchens in B♭ major (Wq. 199:3)
- H. 680. Der Morgen in A major (Wq. 199:6)
- H. 681. Die Biene in A major (Wq. 199:9)
- H. 682. Die Küsse in E major (Wq. 199:13)
- H. 683. Der Stoiker in E minor (Wq. 199:8)
- H. 684. Serin in D minor (Wq. 199:15)
- H. 685. La Sophie in B♭ major
- H. 686. Gellert's Sacred Odes & Lieder (Wq. 194)
- H. 687. Herausforderungslied vor der Schlacht bey Rossbach (Wq. 199:20)
- H. 688. Freude in E major (Wq. 202:A)
- H. 689. Am Namenstag der Mademoiselle S in G major (Wq. 199:16)
- H. 690. Der Traum in A major (Wq. 199:17)
- H. 691. Die Tugend in C major (Wq. 199:18)
- H. 692. Doris in F major (Wq. 199:19)
- H. 693. Das Privilegium in F minor (Wq. 202:B1)
- H. 694. Die Landschaft in G major (Wq. 202:B2)
- H. 695. Belinde in E minor (Wq. 202:B3)
- H. 696. Gellert's Sacred Odes & Lieder (Wq. 195)
- H. 697. Phyllis und Thirsis (Wq. 232)
- H. 698. Bachus und Venus in A minor (Wq. 202:D)
- H. 699. Der Wirth und die Gäste in F major (Wq. 201)
- H. 700. Belise und Thyrsis in F major (Wq. 200:10)
- H. 701. An eine kleine Schöne in C♯ minor (Wq. 200:20)
- H. 702. An die Natur in E minor (Wq. 200:6)
- H. 703. An meine Ruhestätte in C major (Wq. 200:8)
- H. 704. An den Schlaf in A minor (Wq. 200:11)
- H. 705. Die Zufriedenheit in D major (Wq. 200:12)
- H. 706. Gartenlied in G major (Wq. 200:15)
- H. 707. Auf den Geburtstag eines Freundes in B minor (Wq. 200:17)
- H. 708. An einen Freunde in C major (Wq. 200:19)
- H. 709. Der Unbeständige in E♭ major (Wq. 202:C1)
- H. 710. Phillis in C major (Wq. 202:C2)
- H. 711. An die Liebe in C minor (Wq. 202:C3)
- H. 712. Weinachtslied in A major (Wq. 202:C4)
- H. 713. Vom Leiden des Erlösers in G minor (Wq. 202:C5)
- H. 714. Klagen einer Schäferin in B minor (Wq. 202:C6)
- H. 715. Ode auf die Gegenwart seiner Majestät in Rom (Wq. 202:C7)
- H. 716. Auf die Auferstehung des Erlösers in E major (Wq. 202:C8)
- H. 717. Ode am Communion-Tage in F minor (Wq. 202:C9)
- H. 718. Loblied in C major (Wq. 202:C10)
- H. 719. Bei dem Grabe in F major (Wq. 202:C11)
- H. 720. Schnitterlied in G major (Wq. 202:C13)
- H. 721. Passionslied in A♭ major (Wq. 202:C12)
- H. 722. Selma in F♯ minor (Wq. 236)
- H. 723. Der Frühling in D major (Wq. 237)
- H. 724. Communionlied in D♯ minor (Wq. 202:E1)
- H. 725. Freudige Erwartung des Todes in F major (Wq. 202:E2)
- H. 726. Ermunterung zur Beständigkeit in C major (Wq. 202:E3)
- H. 727. Glückseligkeit des Christen in A minor (Wq. 202:E4)
- H. 728. Osterlied in B♭ major (Wq. 202:E5)
- H. 729. Des Herrn Wort ist wahrhaftig in C♯ minor (Wq. 202:E6)
- H. 730. Klagelied eines Bauern in A minor (Wq. 202:O2)
- H. 731. Vaterlandslied in E♭ major (Wq. 202:F1)
- H. 732. Der Bauer in F major (Wq. 202:F2)
- H. 733. Psalms translated by Cramer (Wq. 196)
- H. 734. Der Frühling an Röschen in E minor (Wq. 200:9)
- H. 735. Die Grazien in C major (Wq. 200:22)
- H. 736. Die Schlummernde in D minor (Wq. 202:G1)
- H. 737. Lyda in A minor (Wq. 202:G2)
- H. 738. Trinklied für Freye in C major (Wq. 202:I1)
- H. 739. Selma in F♯ minor (Wq. 202:I2)
- H. 740. Trinklied in C major (Wq. 200:13)
- H. 741. An Doris in F major (Wq. 200:21)
- H. 742. Auf den Flügeln des Morgenroths (Wq. 202:O1)
- H. 742. Auf den Flügeln des Morgenroths in E major (Wq. 202:O1)
- H. 743. Die Trennung in D minor (Wq. 202:O4)
- H. 744. An den Schlaf in D minor (Wq. 202:H)
- H. 745. Todtengräberlied in D minor (Wq. 200:1)
- H. 746. Selma in C major (Wq. 202:J)
- H. 747. Aus einer Ode zum neuen Jahr in G major (Wq. 200:14)
- H. 748. An die Grazien und Musen in D major (Wq. 200:5)
- H. 749. Spirituals by Christoph Sturm (Wq. 197)
- H. 750. Fischerlied in A minor (Wq. 202:K1)
- H. 751. Tischlied in F major (Wq. 202:K2)
- H. 752. Spirituals by Christoph Sturm (Wq. 198)
- H. 753. Lied in E minor (Wq. 202:L1)
- H. 754. Das Milchmädchen in C major (Wq. 202:L2)
- H. 755. Lied der Schnitterinnen in F major (Wq. 200:2)
- H. 756. Nonnelied in E minor (Wq. 200:3)
- H. 757. Das mitleidige Mädchen in G minor (Wq. 200:4)
- H. 758. Bevelise und Lysidor in E♭ major (Wq. 200:7)
- H. 759. Mittel, freundlich zu werden in E♭ major (Wq. 200:16)
- H. 760. Hoffe auf Gott in C major (Wq. 200:18)
- H. 761. Fürsten sind am Lebensziele in B♭ major (Wq. 214) (lost)
- H. 762. Freudenlied in G major (Wq. 231)
- H. 763. 2 Songs (lost)
- H. 764. Masonic Songs (Wq. 202:N)
- H. 765. Aus dem 107. Psalm in B♭ major (Wq. 202:O3)
- H. 766. Sie schönste soll bei Sonnenschein in C major (Wq. 202:O5)
- H. 767. D'amor per te languisco in D major (Wq. 213)
- H. 768. An den Mond in E♭ major
- H. 769. Weil Gott uns das Gesicht verlieh in A major
- H. 769.5. Climene in G major
- H. 770. Cancionetta in G major
- H. 771. Nachahmung einiger Stellen des anderen Psalms in C major

== Liturgical works ==
- H. 772. Magnificat in D major (Wq. 215)
- H. 773. Der 2. Psalm in F major (Wq. 205)
- H. 774. Der 4. Psalm in G minor (Wq. 206)
- H. 775. Die Israeliten in der Wüste (Wq. 238)
- H. 776. Die letzten Leiden des Erlösers (Wq. 233)
- H. 777. Die Auferstehung und Himmelfahrt Jesu (Wq. 240)
- H. 778. Heilig ist Gott (Wq. 217)
- H. 779. Klopstocks Morgengesang am Schöpfungsfeste (Wq. 239)
- H. 780. 2 Litaneyen aus dem Schleswig Gesangbuche (Wq. 204)
- H. 781. Neue Melodien des neuen Hamburgischen Gesangbuchs (Wq. 203)

== Passions ==
- H. 782. St. Matthew Passion 1769
- H. 783. St. Mark Passion 1770 (lost)
- H. 790. St. Matthew Passion Passion 1777 (lost)
- H. 791. St. Mark Passion 1778 (lost)
- H. 792. St. Luke Passion 1779

== Cantatas ==
- H. 803. Oster Cantate (Wq. 244)
- H. 804. Oster Musik (Wq. 242)
- H. 805. Oster Musik (Wq. 241)
- H. 806. Oster Kantate (lost)
- H. 807. Osterquartal-Musik (Wq. 243)
- H. 808. Oster Cantate (lost)
- H. 809. Michaelis-Musik (Wq. 248) (lost)
- H. 810. Michaelis-Musik (Wq. 245)
- H. 811. Michaelis-Musik (H. 811) (lost)
- H. 812. Michaelis-Musik (Wq. 212, 247)
- H. 813. Michaelis-Musik (H. 813) (lost)
- H. 814. Michaelis-Musik (Wq. 246)
- H. 815. Weihnacht-Cantate (Wq. 249)
- H. 816. Weihnacht-Cantate (lost)
- H. 817. Pfingst-Cantate (lost)
- H. 818. Cantate am 16. Sonntage nach Trinitatis
- H. 818.5. Cantate am 20. Sonntage nach Trinitatis
- H. 819. Cantate auf Mariä Heimsuchung (lost)
- H. 820. 4 Sonntagsmusik (lost)
- H. 821a. Herrn Pastors Palm Einführungsmusik (lost)
- H. 821b. Herrn Pastors Klefecker Einführungsmusik (lost)
- H. 821c. Herrn Pastors Schuchmachers Einführungsmusik
- H. 821d. Herrn Pastors Häseler Einführungsmusik (partly lost)
- H. 821e. Herrn Pastors Hornbostel Einführungsmusik (lost)
- H. 821f. Herrn Pastors Winkler Einführungsmusik (Wq. 252)
- H. 821g. Herrn Pastors Friderici Einführungsmusik (Wq. 251)
- H. 821h. Herrn Pastors Gerling Einführungsmusik
- H. 821i. Herrn Pastors Sturm Einführungsmusik (lost)
- H. 821j. Herrn Pastors Rambach Einführungsmusik (lost)
- H. 821k. Herrn Pastors Jänisch Einführungsmusik (lost)
- H. 821l. Herrn Pastors Gasie Einführungsmusik (Wq. 250)
- H. 821m. Herrn Pastors Schäfer Einführungsmusik (Wq. 253)
- H. 821n. Herrn Pastors Berkhahn Einführungsmusik (lost)
- H. 821o. Herrn Pastors Willerding Einführungsmusik (lost)
- H. 822a. Oratorium zur Feyer des Ehrenmahls der Herrn Bürger-Capitans in Hamburg (1780)
- H. 822b. Serenata zur Feyer des Ehrenmahls der Herrn Bürger-Capitains in Hamburg (1780)
- H. 822c. Oratorium zur Feyer des Ehrenmahls der Herrn Bürger-Capitans in Hamburg (lost)
- H. 822d. Serenata zur Feyer des Ehrenmahls der Herrn Bürger-Capitains in Hamburg (1783)
- H. 823. Musik am Dankfeste wegen des fertigen Michaelis-Thurms
- H. 824a. Trauungs-Cantate (lost)
- H. 824b. Geburtstags-Cantate (lost)
- H. 824c. Herrn Dr. Hoeck Jubelmusik (lost)
- H. 824d. Herrn Syndicus Klefeker Jubelmusik (lost)
- H. 824e. Dank-Hymne der Freundschaft
- H. 824f. Jubelmusik auf den Geburtstag der Madame Stresow (lost)

== Motets and choral works ==
- H. 825. Veni Sancte Spiritus in G major (Wq. 207)
- H. 826. 4 Motteten (Wq. 208)
- H. 827. Heilig in C major (Wq. 218)
- H. 828. Sanctus in C minor (Wq. 219)
- H. 829. Spiega, Hammonia fortunata in D major (Wq. 216)
- H. 830. Mein Heiland, meine Zuversicht in F major (Wq. 221)
- H. 831. Der 8. Psalm in A major (Wq. 222)
- H. 832. Zeige du mir deine Wege in C major (Wq. 223)
- H. 833. Gott, dem ich lebe in E♭ major (Wq. 225)
- H. 834. Amen, Amen, Lob und Preis in D major (Wq. 226)
- H. 835. Leite mich nach deinem Willen in A minor (Wq. 227)
- H. 836. Meine Lebenzeit verstreicht in E♭ major (Wq. 228)
- H. 837. Meinen Leib wird man begraben in B♭ major (Wq. 229)
- H. 838. Merkt und seht in C major (incomplete)
- H. 839. Et cum spiritu in G major (Wq. 209) (lost)
- H. 840. Amen in G major (Wq. 210) (lost)
- H. 841. Wirf dein Anliegen auf (lost)
- H. 842. 10 Choräle zur Liedern des Grafen von Wernigerode
- H. 843. Naglet til et Kors paa Jorden in G minor
- H. 844. 3 Choräle des Schleswigen Gesangbuchs
- H. 845. Chorale in Vierstimmige alte und neue Choralgesänge (lost)
- H. 846. 4 Choräle (lost)

== Miscellaneous ==
- H. 847. Trumpet & timpani parts added to Graun's Te Deum (after Carl Heinrich Graun)
- H. 848. Instrumental parts to J.S.Bach's chorus BWV195 (lost)
- H. 849. Instrumental introduction to Credo of J.S. Bach's Mass BWV 232
- H. 850. 2 Recitatives for 2 cantatas by Fasch (lost)
- H. 851. Recitative & Aria for a cantata
- H. 852. Aria for a cantata
- H. 853. Aria for a cantata in D major
- H. 854. Various accompagnatos to other composers' works (lost)
- H. 855. Hilf daß ich folge in A minor
- H. 856. Veni Sancte Spiritus in D major (Wq. 220) (lost)
- H. 857. Selig sind die Toten in E♭ major
- H. 858. Mass in B♭ major
- H. 859. Die Pilgrime auf Golgotha
- H. 860. Markus Passion
- H. 861. Esto mihi (lost)
- H. 862. Ecce cui iniquitatibus in E minor (fragment)
- H. 863. Miserere mei in A minor (fragment)
- H. 864. Kommt laßt uns anbeten in A minor
- H. 865. 11 Motets
- H. 866. Aria for Der Tod Jesu in G major
- H. 867. Miscellanea Musica (Wq. 121)
- H. 868. Versuch über die wahre Art das Clavier zu spielen I (Wq. 254)
- H. 869. Einfall einen doppelten Contrapunct in der Octave (Wq. 257)
- H. 870. Versuch über die wahre Art das Clavier zu spielen II (Wq. 255)
- H. 871. Zwey Litaneyen aus dem Schleswig-Holsteinischen Gesangbuch
- H. 872. Gedanken eines Liebhabers der Tonkunst über Herrn Nichelmanns Tractat
- H. 873. Von der Fingersetzung (Wq. 256)
- H. 874. Kurze Anweisung zum Generalbass (Wq. 258)
- H. 875. Anleitung so viel Walzer man will mit Würfeln zu componieren
- H deest. Pastorale for oboe, bassoon & continuo
