= Jon Laukvik =

Norwegian organist

Jon Laukvik (born 16 December 1952) is a Norwegian organist.

Laukvik was born in Oslo, where he studied church music, organ and piano. Afterwards, he worked with Michael Schneider and Hugo Ruf in Cologne and Marie-Claire Alain in Paris. In 1980, he was appointed professor of organ at the Hochschule für Musik und Darstellende Kunst in Stuttgart. In 2001, he was appointed professor at the Norwegian Academy of Music in Oslo, where he has been teaching until 2017. Since 2003, he is also a guest professor at the Royal Academy of Music in London.

== Awards ==
- 1977: International organ week Nuremberg
- 1977: International organ competition (Deutscher evangelischer Kirchentag)

== Publications ==
- Orgelschule zur historischen Aufführungspraxis
