= Carl Philipp Emanuel Bach Edition =

The Carl Philipp Emanuel Bach Edition was an edition of the music of C.P.E. Bach projected between 1982 and 1995. Many noted musical scholars, such as Christopher Hogwood, were participants in it, and it had the support of the National Endowment for the Humanities.

Unfortunately, although musicologist and contributor David Schulenberg (fr) states that several volumes were prepared by their designated editors, only four volumes ever saw publication, and at present these are out of print. (These four volumes were published by Oxford University Press.)

However, many of the same Emanuel Bach specialists involved in this abandoned edition are now involved in the preparation of Carl Philipp Emanuel Bach: The Complete Works, an edition of C.P.E. Bach's music started in 2005.

== See also ==
- Carl Philipp Emanuel Bach: The Complete Works

== Sources ==
- Prof. David Schulenberg's page on Emanuel Bach's Concerto Wq. 24, including most of the information summarized above about the fate of the Carl Philipp Emanuel Bach Edition.
- Rachel W. Wade, "Filiation and the Editing of Revised and Alternate Versions: Implications for the C.P.E. Bach Edition," in Stephen L. Clark, ed., C.P.E. Bach Studies (Oxford: Clarendon Press, 1988), ISBN 0-19-816244-8, pp. 277-94.
- Christopher Hogwood's curriculum vitae from his website (Source of statement regarding his involvement).
