= Paul Walker (musicologist) =

American musicologist

Paul Walker is an American musicologist, organist, harpsichordist and conductor. He is Professor of the Practice Emeritus at the University of Notre Dame. His scholarship focuses on fugue and early modern music. His book Theories of Fugue from the Age of Josquin to the Age of Bach won the American Bach Society’s William H. Scheide Prize in 2002.

== Education and career ==
Walker earned his Bachelor of Arts in Liberal Arts from Albion College in 1975. and Master of Music in Organ from the University of Kansas in 1976.He completed his music studies at the Musikhochschule in Cologne, West Germany, from 1976 to 1977, focusing on organ with Michael Schneider and harpsichord with Hugo Ruf. Walker earned his Ph.D. in Musicology at the State University of New York at Buffalo in 1987

Walker joined the University of Virginia faculty in 1992, where he taught until 2010. In 2011, Walker joined the University of Notre Dame, initially as Adjunct Associate Professor of Music.

Walker retired from full-time teaching in 2020 and was named Professor of the Practice Emeritus at the University of Notre Dame.

In 1991, Walker founded the early music vocal ensemble Zephyrus, based in Charlottesville, Virginia, and served as its director until 2011.

== Scholarly works ==
His work include Bach’s Well-Tempered Clavier (2025) and Fugue in the Sixteenth Century (2021).

His earlier work,Theories of Fugue from the Age of Josquin to the Age of Bach (2000), received the William H. Scheide Prize from the American Bach Society.

Walker also co-authored German Sacred Polyphonic Vocal Music between Schütz and Bach: A List of Sources and Critical Modern Editions (with Diane Parr Walker 1992) and edited Church, Stage, and Studio: Music and Its Contexts in Seventeenth-Century Germany (1990).
