= Piano Sonata No. 17 (Beethoven) =

Piano sonata by Ludwig van Beethoven

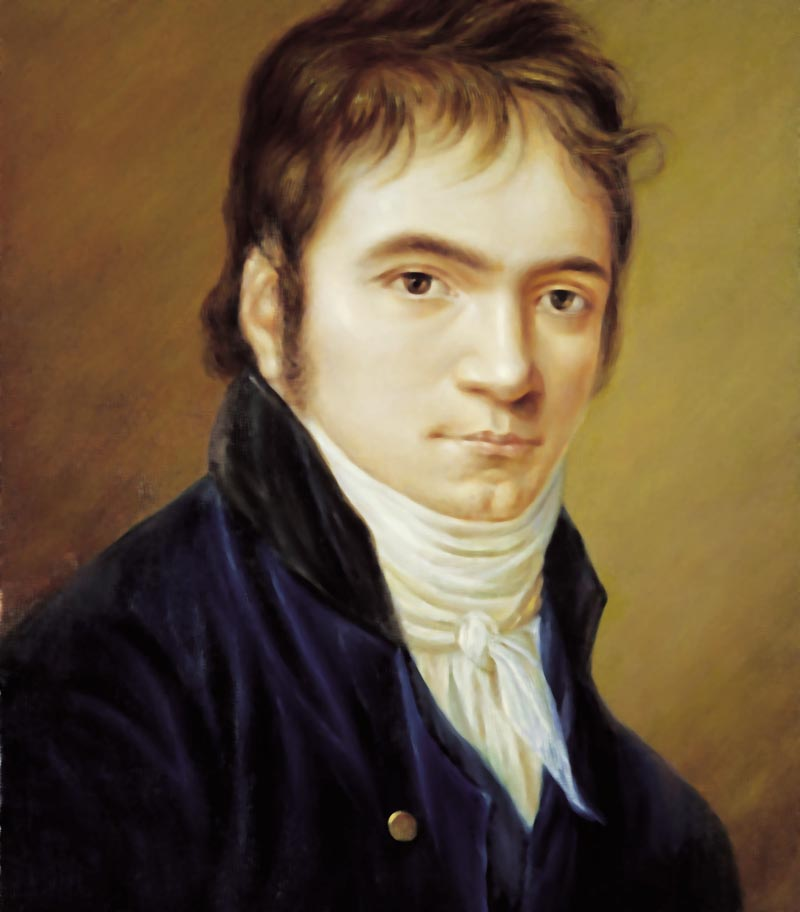
Ludwig van Beethoven in 1803

The Piano Sonata No. 17 in D minor, Op. 31, No. 2, known as The Tempest, was composed in 1801–02 by Ludwig van Beethoven. The British music scholar Donald Francis Tovey says in A Companion to Beethoven's Pianoforte Sonatas:

With all the tragic power of its first movement the D minor Sonata is, like Prospero, almost as far beyond tragedy as it is beyond mere foul weather. It will do you no harm to think of Miranda at bars 31–38 of the slow movement... but people who want to identify Ariel and Caliban and the castaways, good and villainous, may as well confine their attention to the exploits of Scarlet Pimpernel when the Eroica or the C minor Symphony is being played.

== Structure ==
I. Largo – Allegro

II. Adagio

III. Allegretto
Played by Artur Schnabel in 1932

The piece consists of three movements and takes approximately 25 minutes to perform:

1. Largo – Allegro
2. Adagio (B♭ major)
3. Allegretto

Each of the movements is in sonata form, although the second lacks a substantial development section.

=== I. Largo – Allegro ===

Unusually, the first movement alternates brief moments of seeming peacefulness with extensive passages of turmoil, after some time expanding into a haunting "storm" in which the peacefulness is lost.. The development begins with rolled, long chords, quickly ending to the tremolo theme of the exposition. There is a long recitative section at the beginning of this movement's recapitulation (foreshadowing the oboe recitative in the first movement of Symphony No. 5), again ending with fast and suspenseful passages that resolve to the home key of D minor.

=== II. Adagio ===

The second movement in B♭ major is slower and more dignified. The rising melodic ideas in the opening six measures are reminiscent of the first movement's recitative. Other ideas in this movement mirror the first; for instance, a figure in the eighth measure and parallel passages of the second movement are similar to a figure in measure 6 of the first. The symbolization which occurs at the beginning of the movement, recurs at both the subsequent turning points, the beginning of the development and that of the recapitulation.

=== III. Allegretto ===

The third movement is also in sonata form and is back in the home key of D minor. It is at first flowing with emotion and then reaching a climax, before moving into an extended development section which mainly focuses on the opening figure of the movement, reaching a climax at measures 169–173. The recapitulation, which is preceded by an extensive cadenza-like passage of sixteenth notes for the right hand, is followed by another transition and then another statement of the primary theme. The refrain undergoes phrase expansion to build tension for the climax of the movement at measure 381, a fortissimo falling chromatic scale.

== Historical context ==
In the spring of 1802, Beethoven followed the advice of his physician, Johann Adam Schmidt, and left Vienna for rural Heiligenstadt. Once there, he fell into despair over his deteriorating hearing and wrote the famous Testament of 6 and 10 October. He likely kept himself busy studying various musical and literary writings. In April, he turned his business affairs over to his younger brother, Carl. Carl managed the business aspects in the most beneficial way possible, even when it was not as ethical. According to Ferdinand Ries, the two argued frequently, but Ludwig forgave him repeatedly between 1802 and 1806. These events likely influenced this piece of music. The subtitle “Tempest,” may also have occurred due to extensive similarities between Beethoven’s relationship with his brother Carl and that between Prospero and Antonio.

== Controversy over the name Tempest ==
The Piano Sonata No. 17 is usually referred to as The Tempest (or Der Sturm in his native German), but the sonata was not given this title by Beethoven, or indeed referred to as such during his lifetime. The name comes from a reference to a personal conversation with Beethoven by his associate Anton Schindler in which Schindler reports that Beethoven suggested, in passing response to his question about interpreting it and Op. 57, the Appassionata sonata, that he should read Der Sturm—Shakespeare's Tempest. Although much of Schindler's information is distrusted by classical music scholars, this is a first-hand account, unlike other scholarly reports.

Some, however, have suggested that Beethoven might have instead been referring to the works of C. C. Sturm, the preacher and author best known for his Reflections on the Works of God in Nature, a copy of which he owned and, indeed, had heavily annotated.

== See also ==
- Für Elise
