= Chaconne and Fugue in D minor, BWV 1178 =

Musical work by Johann Sebastian Bach

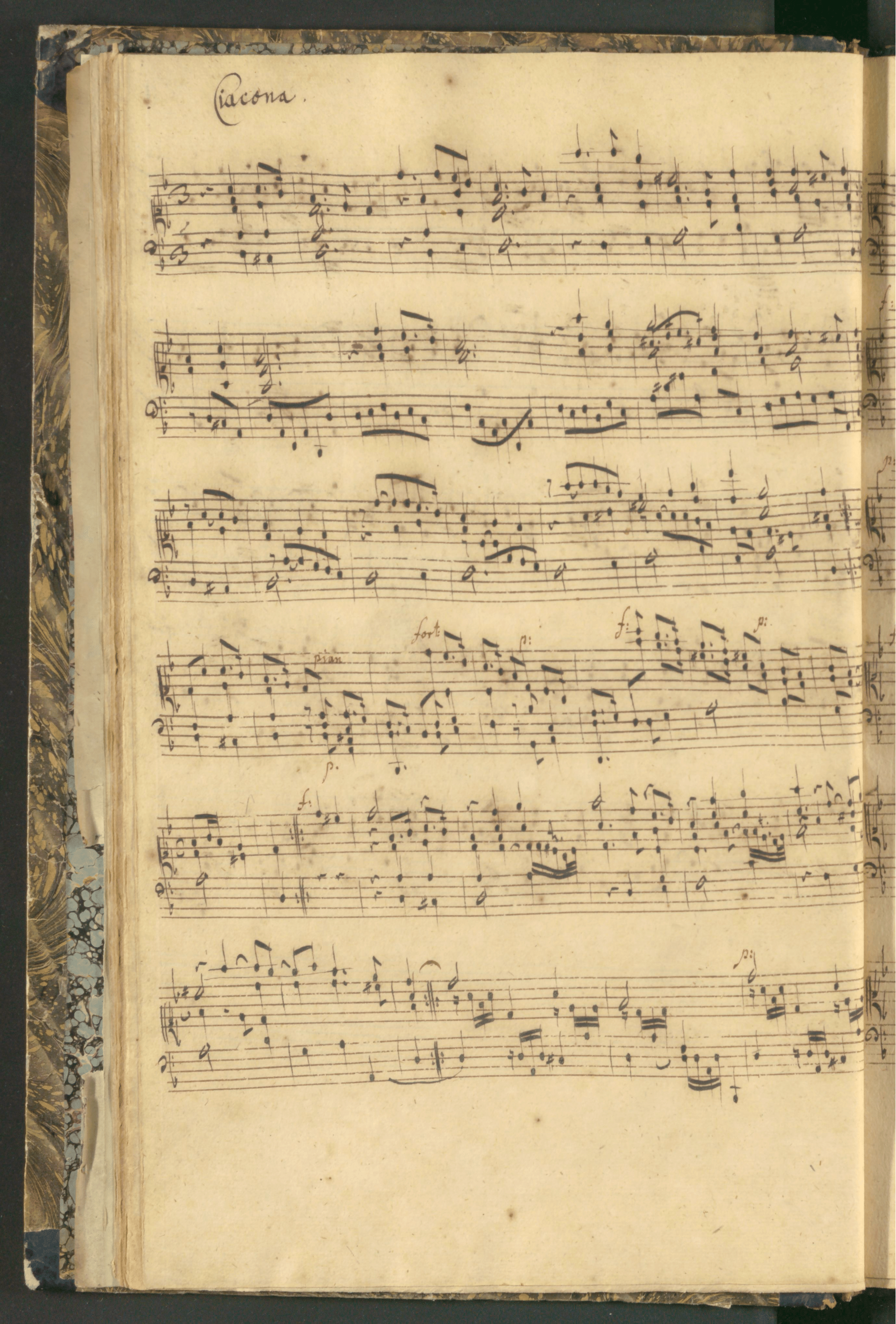

Chaconne and Fugue in D minor, BWV 1178 is a composition for organ composed by Johann Sebastian Bach. Salomon Günther John (born 1695), a pupil of Bach, wrote the manuscript in 1705. This was not signed and so was not attributed to Bach until research by Peter Wollny, starting in 1992. It was performed in St. Thomas Church, Leipzig, where Bach is buried, by Ton Koopman in 2025. It is catalogued as BWV 1178 in the Bach-Werke-Verzeichnis.

The chaconne and fugue in D minor were previously attributed to Johann Graf (1684–1750).
