= Gellert Odes and Songs =

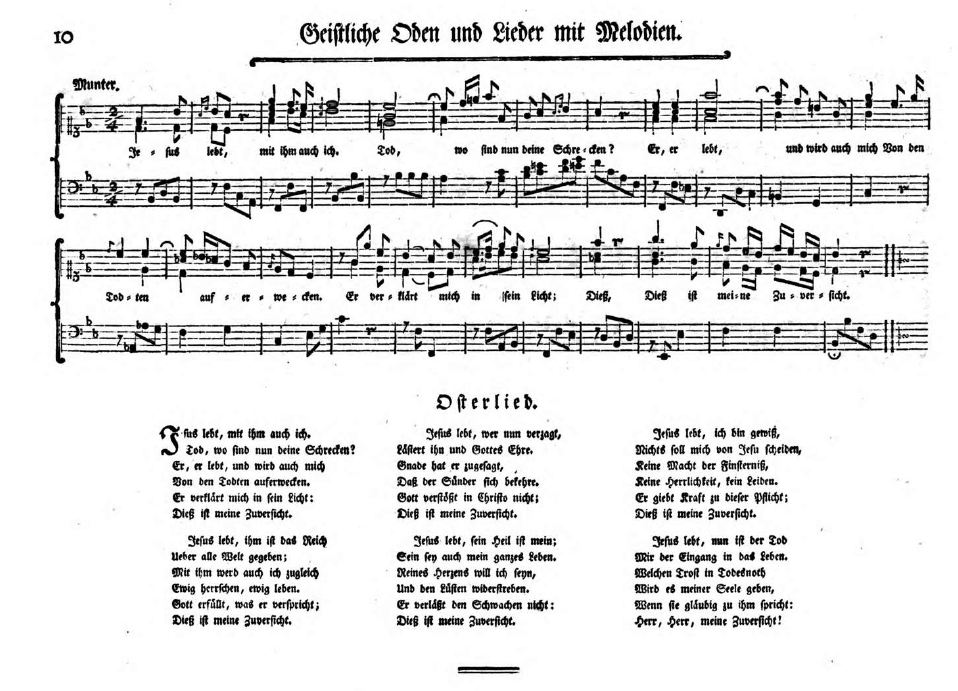
A page from the 1771 edition of Geistliche Oden und Lieder, showing the typical length and notation of the lieder of the collection.

Geistliche Oden und Lieder ("Sacred Odes and Songs", H. 686, Wq 194), also known as Gellert Oden ("Gellert Odes"), is a collection of songs by Carl Philipp Emanuel Bach with texts by Christian Fürchtegott Gellert. Originally published in 1758, Bach's work enjoyed continuous popularity for several decades and influenced numerous composers, most importantly Ludwig van Beethoven, who composed his own settings of six of Gellert's poems.

== History of composition ==
One of the best known German poets of his time, Christian Fürchtegott Gellert was a professor of philosophy at Leipzig University. In 1757, at age 42, he published Geistliche Oden und Lieder, a collection of sacred poetry that enjoyed considerable success. Gellert himself suggested that the poems could be sung to traditional chorale melodies, and although the poetry employs a vast number of forms and techniques, provisions were made by Gellert to make musical settings possible.

According to the foreword to the first edition of Geistliche Oden und Lieder, written by Bach himself, the composer was so impressed with the poetry that it suggested to him a novel kind of song setting; he proceeded to create settings for all 54 of Gellert's poems – however, in Bach's collection the order of poems is completely different from Gellert's volume. The volume was published by George Ludewig Winter in 1758; Bach's foreword is dated February 1, 1758. Both Gellert's poetry and Bach's setting of it enjoyed considerable popularity: several more collections of settings of Gellert's poems appeared, including some by distinguished composers such as the famous music theorist Friedrich Wilhelm Marpurg, and Johann Friedrich Doles, a pupil of Johann Sebastian Bach). In the 19th century, Beethoven published six settings of Gellert's poems as Gellert Lieder., Op. 48 (1802), influenced both by the poet and by Bach's settings of his poetry.

During Bach's lifetime, Gellert Oden was reprinted five times, with the last edition appearing in 1784. Bach's setting remained the only complete one, covering all 54 poems. The success of this collection inspired Bach to produce more sacred lieder. These included a collection of 42 psalms, titled Psalmen mit Melodien (1774), H. 733 (Wq 196), and 60 sacred songs published as two volumes of Geistliche Gesänge mit Melodien in 1780–81, H. 749, 752 (Wq 197, 198).

== Form ==
Each of Gellert's poems comprises several stanzas, and the structure of stanzas remains the same throughout a given poem. Thus Bach's settings provide music for a single stanza, to be repeated and improvised upon, for as many times as there are stanzas in a poem. Contrary to later song cycles, the music is written on two staves instead of three. The style of the accompaniment grows out of the Baroque basso continuo practice: Bach himself noted in the preface that he added harmonies to his melodies in order to prevent incompetent figured bass performers from ruining the music. Nevertheless, the parts are sufficiently simple and unornamented as to allow a generous amount of ornamentation and improvisation by the performer.
