= Carl-Philipp-Emanuel-Bach-Straße =

Street in Frankfurt (Oder), Germany

Coordinates: 52°20′41.77″N 14°33′17.33″E

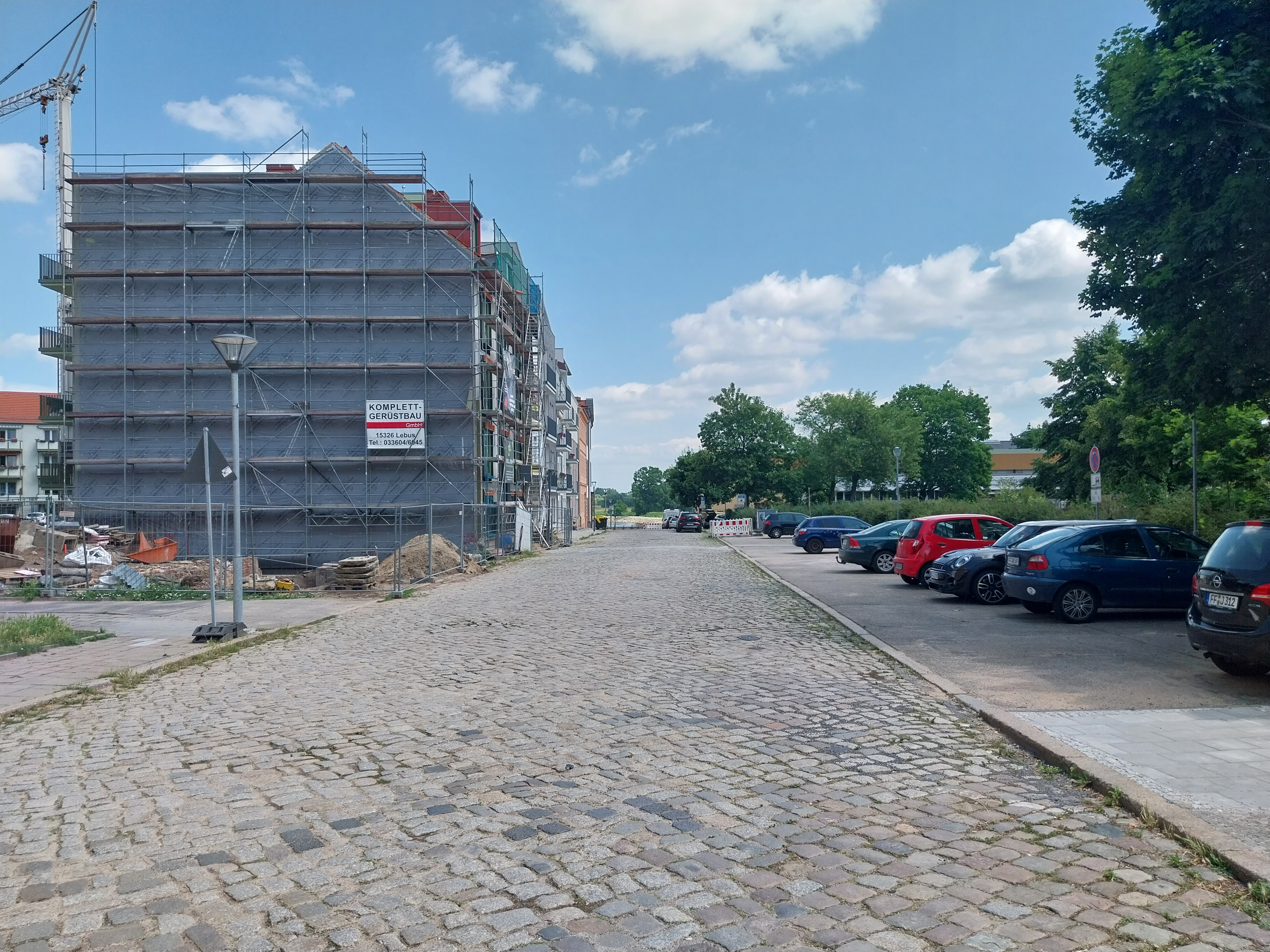

Carl-Philipp-Emanuel-Bach-Straße is a street in Frankfurt (Oder), Germany.

Named after the 18th-century German musician and composer Carl Philipp Emanuel Bach, Carl-Philipp-Emanuel-Bach-Straße is indeed one of the longest street names in the world, certainly Germany.

Apart from being very close to the Oder river and the border crossing to Słubice, Poland, Carl-Philipp-Emanuel-Bach-Straße is home to part of the Viadrina Museum in the Junker house and Museum for Junge Kunst.
