= Magnificat (C. P. E. Bach) =

- by Carl Philipp Emanuel Bach
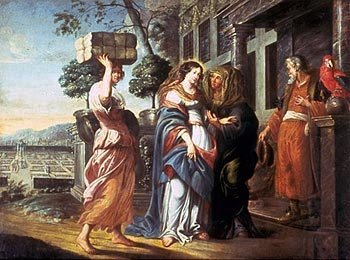
- Heimsuchung, occasion of Mary's song of praise, Rubens school, Unionskirche, Idstein
- Key: D major
- Catalogue: Wq 215; H.772
- Bible text: Luke 1:46–55
- Composed: 1749: Berlin
- Published: 1829: Bonn by N. Simrock
- Movements: 9
- Vocal: SATB choir and solo
- Instrumental: 2 horns; 2 traverse flutes; 2 oboes; bassoon; 2 violins; viola; continuo; (optional:) 3 trumpets; timpani

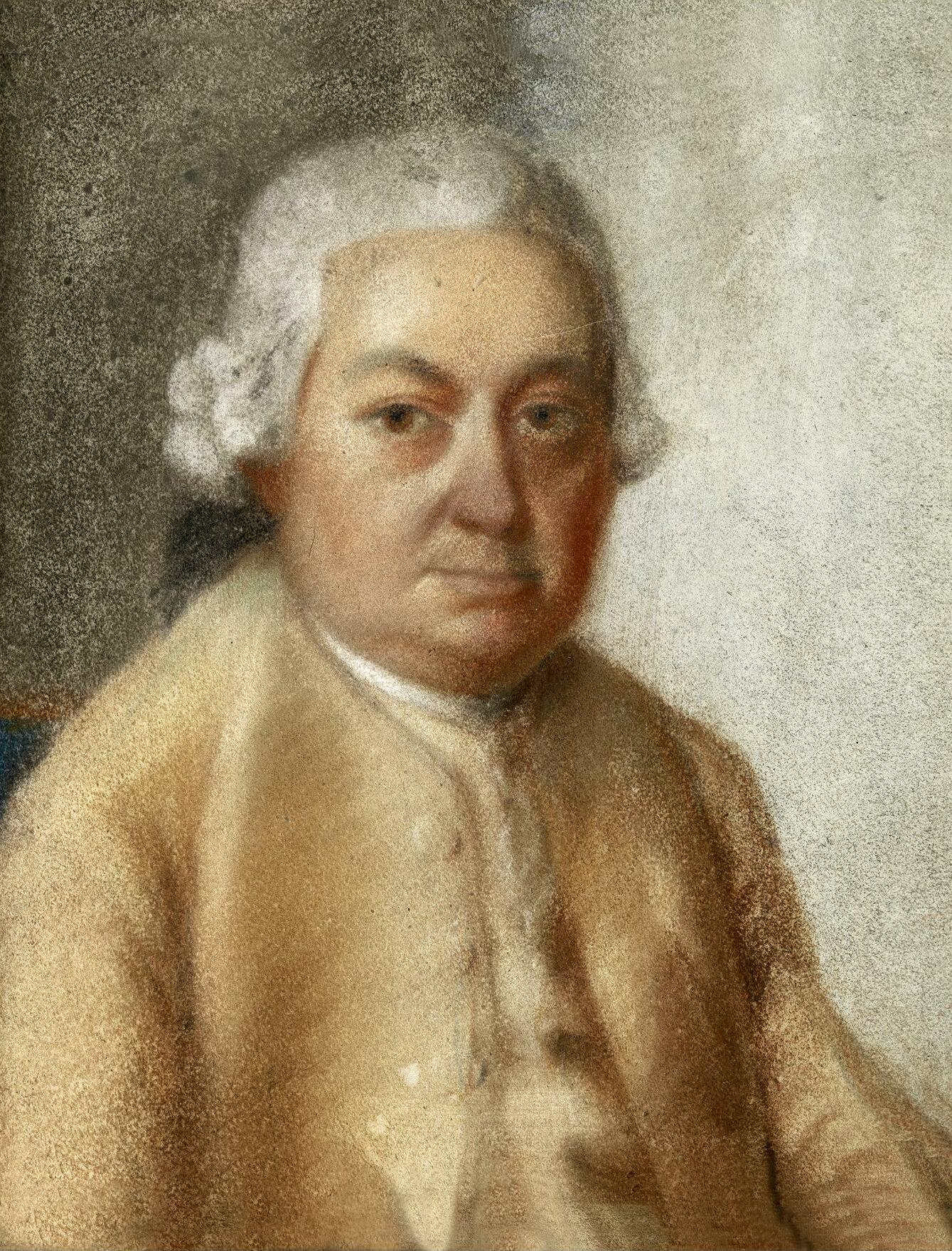
The composer, 1773

The Magnificat, Wq 215, H.772, by Carl Philipp Emanuel Bach is a musical setting of the biblical canticle Magnificat as an extended composition for voices and orchestra in nine movements, composed in Berlin in 1749. It is the composer's first extant major choral composition.

== History ==
In Leipzig, where the composer grew up, the Magnificat was regularly part of Sunday services, sung in German on ordinary Sundays but more elaborately and in Latin on the high holidays (Christmas, Easter and Pentecost) and on the three Marian feasts Annunciation, Visitation and Purification. When J. S. Bach's setting of the Magnificat was first performed on 2 July 1723, the boy was nine years old, ten years later his father transposed it to D major and performed it again. C. P. E. Bach set the text in the same key as the later version, formally as a cantata, in 1749 in Berlin, where he was a harpsichordist at the court of Frederick the Great.

Some sources assume that Bach composed the piece to apply for the title of Hofkapellmeister at the court of Amalie, the king's sister, others suggest that he composed it to apply for his father's post as Thomaskantor in Leipzig. Another suggested possibility, a composition intended for a memorial concert for his father for which every composing son wished to supply a piece worthy of him ("seiner würdig"), seems less likely as the father was still alive when the piece was composed.

John Butt notes that the Amen fugue of the Magnificat shows similarities to parts of the Mass in B minor, the Gratias from the Missa and the Ex expecto from the Symbolum Nicenum.

The composer chose the work to conclude a charity concert which he conducted in Hamburg in 1786 for the Medizinisches Armeninstitut. The concert began with the Credo from his father's Mass in B minor, followed by two excerpts from Handel's Messiah, the Hallelujah Chorus and the aria I know that my redeemer liveth, both sung in German. Magnificat was published in 1829 by N. Simrock in Bonn. It is the composer's first extant major choral composition.

== Scoring and structure ==
Bach scored the work in D major for four vocal soloists (soprano (S), alto (A), tenor (T) and bass (B)), a SATB four-part choir, and a Baroque orchestra of two traverse flutes (Ft), two oboes (Ob), two horns (Co), bassoon (Fg), two violins (Vl), viola (Va) and basso continuo (Bc), with three trumpets and timpani ad libitum. It takes about 42 minutes to perform.

=== Movements ===
The Magnificat setting consists of seven movements for the text of the canticle (Luke 1:46-55), concluded by two movements of the doxology. The following table shows the title, voices, tempo marking, time, key and text source for the nine movements, based on the vocal score, edited by Günter Graulich after the autograph.

Movements of C. P. E. Bach's Magnificat
	Title	Voices	Tempo	Meter	Key	Text source
1	Magnificat	SATB	Allegro di molto	common time	D major	Luke 1:47
2	Quia respexit	S	Andante	3/4	B minor	Luke 1:48
3	Quia fecit	T	Allegro assai	common time	G major	Luke 1:49
4	Et misericordia	S A SATB	Andantino	3/4	E minor	Luke 1:50
5	Fecit potentiam	B	Allegro	2/4	A major	Luke 1:51
6	Deposuit potentes de sede	A T	Allegretto	common time	A minor	Luke 1:52–53
7	Suscepit Israel	A	Andante. Con sordini.	3/4	D minor	Luke 1:54–55
8	Gloria patri	SATB	Allegro di molto	common time	D major	Doxology
9	Sicut erat in principio	SATB	Alla breve moderato	cut time	D major	Doxology

== Sources ==
- Butt, John (1991). Bach: Mass in B Minor. Cambridge: Cambridge University Press. ISBN 9780521387163.
- Graulich, Günter, ed. (1969). Carl Philipp Emanuel Bach / Magnificat (Wq 215) / Vokalpartitur (in German). Stuttgart: Hänssler.
- Blanken, Christine (2014). "Introduction" (PDF). cpebach 1714.
- Büning, Eleonore (2014). "Carl Philipp Emanuel Bach / Ein unbekannter Riese im Schatten seines Vaters" (in German). Frankfurter Allgemeine Zeitung.
- Geffers, Andrea (2008). "Carl Philipp Emanuel Bach "Magnificat" D-Dur" (in German). Johanneskirche, Berlin-Zehlendorf.
- Jones, Richard D. P. (2013). The Creative Development of Johann Sebastian Bach, Volume II: 1717–1750: Music to Delight the Spirit. Oxford University Press. pp. 132–133. ISBN 978-0-19-969628-4.
- "Carl Philipp Emanuel Bach / Magnificat". Carus-Verlag.
- "Carl Philipp Emanuel Bach: Magnificat, Die Himmel erzählen die Ehre Gottes". Carus-Verlag.
- "Das Magnificat – ein Bewerbungsstück?" (in German). cpebach 1714. 2014.
