= Oboe Concerto (Carl Phillip Emanuel Bach) =

18th-century concerto by C. P. E. Bach

The Oboe Concerto in E♭ major is an oboe concerto by Carl Phillip Emanuel Bach composed in 1765.

== Structure ==
The work is scored for solo oboe, strings and continuo in three movements:

1. Allegro
2. Adagio ma non troppo
3. Allegro ma non troppo
