= La Caroline (C. P. E. Bach) =

La Caroline, Wq. 117/39, H. 98, is a character piece (or piece de caractare) for solo keyboard in A minor, written by Carl Philipp Emanuel Bach. Bach wrote several character pieces which were often grouped together and published as a set. These character pieces were based on similar works composed by François Couperin. La Caroline along with La Philippine (Wq 117/34, H. 96) may have been named after his daughter Anna Carolina Philippina.

MIDI of La Caroline
