= Carl Philipp Emanuel Bach: The Complete Works =

Sheet music edition project and website

Carl Philipp Emanuel Bach: The Complete Works is a critical edition of the music and keyboard treatise by C.P.E. Bach. The project was begun in 1998–99 in the wake of the aborted Carl Philipp Emanuel Bach Edition, and many of the same eminent music scholars associated with the earlier incomplete edition have become involved with the new one. From 1999–2014, the new edition was chaired by Christopher Hogwood. After his death in 2014, Robert D. Levin was appointed chair. The general editors are Darrell Berg (series I), Peter Wollny (series II, III, VII), and Ulrich Leisinger (series IV, V, VI). The edition is published by the Packard Humanities Institute. The current Editorial Guidelines (January 2015) are available in PDF format on the edition’s website: http://www.cpebach.org.

The edition is organized in the following eight series:

1. Keyboard Music
2. Chamber Music
3. Orchestral Music
4. Oratorios and Passions
5. Choral Music
6. Songs and Vocal Chamber Music
7. Theoretical Works
8. Supplement

The original plan called for approximately 70 volumes to be completed by 2014, the 300th anniversary of C.P.E. Bach’s birth.^{1} But in 1999 the lost archives of the Berlin Singakademie were recovered in Kyiv and eventually returned to the Staatsbibliothek zu Berlin.^{2} This collection includes many unique sources for the late Hamburg vocal music, and thus gives us access to nearly the complete output of the composer, which subsequently has increased the number of volumes in the edition to 115. The first volumes were published in 2005, and more than 80 volumes have been published as of May 2018. Details on the contents of all volumes, including a search function by Wotquenne and Helm numbers, are available on the edition’s website. Published volumes may be ordered through the website, and performing material for chamber, orchestral, and choral music is available to download free of charge.

== Notes ==
- For an additional background on the edition, see Paul Corneilson, “Organizing the Complete Works of C.P.E. Bach,” Early Music 42 (2014); idem, “C.P.E. Bach and the Challenge of Breaking into the Canon,” Die Tonkunst (2014), pp. 15–24; idem, with Laura Buch, Jason B. Grant, Mark W. Knoll, “Carl Philipp Emanuel Bach: The Complete Works,” Fontes artis musicae, 58/2 (2011), pp. 127–136; idem, “Tracking the Sources for Carl Philipp Emanuel Bach’s Complete Works,” Harvard Library Bulletin 18/1–2 (2008), pp. 33–36; idem, “The C.P.E. Bach Edition and the Future of Scholarly Editions,” Music Reference Services Quarterly 8/1 (2001), pp. 27–37.
- See Christoph Wolff, "Recovered in Kiev: Bach et al. a Preliminary Report on the Music Collection of the Berlin Sing-Akademie," MLA Notes 58 (2001), pp. 259–271. For an earlier reconstruction listing the Singakademie’s holdings of C.P.E. Bach, see Elias N. Kulukundis, "C.P.E. Bach in the Library of the Singakademie zu Berlin," in C.P.E. Bach Studies, ed. Stephen L. Clark (Oxford: Clarendon Press, 1988), pp. 159-76. See also Heinrich Miesner, Philipp Emanuel Bach in Hamburg: Beiträge zu seiner Biographie und zur Musikgeschichte seiner Zeit (Leipzig: Breitkopf & Härtel, 1929), who studied the Singakademie archives before World War II.

== Sources ==
- Official website
