= Peter Wollny =

German musicologist (born 1961)

- Born: 29 June 1961 (age 64); Sevelen, West Germany
- Education: University of Cologne; Harvard University
- Occupation: Musicologist
- Organizations: Bach Archive; University of Leipzig

Peter Wollny (born 29 June 1961) is a German musicologist, a Bach scholar who has served the Bach Archive Leipzig beginning in 1993, and as its director from 2014. Wollny has contributed to the Neue Bach-Ausgabe, and has been an editor of Carl Philipp Emanuel Bach: The Complete Works. He is professor at the University of Leipzig, and teaches internationally. He received an honorary doctorate from the University of Uppsala.

== Career ==
Wollny was born in Sevelen, Issum. He studied musicology, art history and German studies at the University of Cologne from 1981 to 1987 He studied musicology further at Harvard University with Christoph Wolff, Lewis Lockwood and Reinhold Brinkmann, where he achieved a Ph.D. in 1993 with a dissertation about Wilhelm Friedemann Bach. He has worked scientifically at the Bach Archive Leipzig, beginning that year. From 2001, he directed the Referat Forschung I, was the scientific Referent of the library and curator of the collection of manuscripts.

Wollny was habilitated in 2009 at the University of Leipzig, writing "Studien zum Stilwandel in der protestantischen Figuralmusik des mittleren 17. Jahrhunderts" (Studies about the change in style in the Protestant figurative music of the mid 17th century). He has been director of the Bach Archive from 2014, and was instrumental in returning the manuscript score of O Ewigkeit, du Donnerwort, BWV 20, to Leipzig. In 2019, the Bach Archive acquired vocal books (Stimmbücher) of the final movement, "Wir setzen uns mit Tränen nieder", of the St Matthew Passion which can be dated to Berlin in the 1770s, proving that Bach's sacred music was performed at least in private circles at that time. Wollny is dramaturge of the Bach Archive's Bachfest Leipzig festival.

Wollny has been professor at the University of Leipzig since 2014. He has also taught regularly in Dresden, and as a guest in Weimar, and the Universität der Künst and Humboldt University in Berlin. He received an honorary doctorate of the University of Uppsala in 2020.

Wollny has contributed to the Neue Bach-Ausgabe and has been a member of the editor team (General Editor) of the collected works of Bach's son, Carl Philipp Emanuel Bach: The Complete Works, the edition of C. P. E. Bach's works. He has been the editor of the Jahrbuch Mitteldeutsche Barockmusik from 2002, and of the Bach-Jahrbuch (Bach Annals) from 2005. His publications focus on the Bach family and the music history of the 17th and 18th centuries.
