= Die Auferstehung und Himmelfahrt Jesu =

- Oratorio by Carl Philipp Emanuel Bach
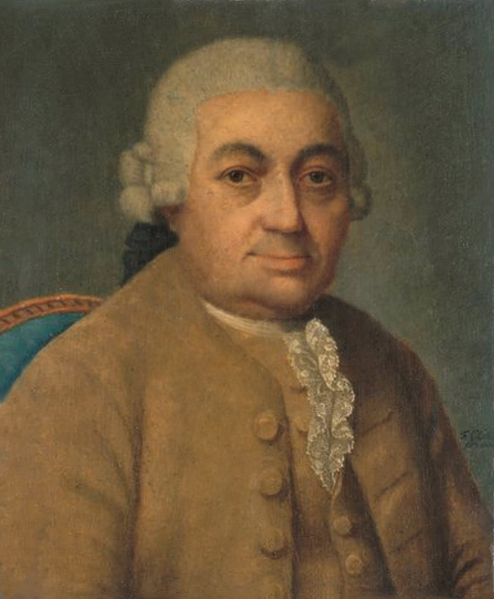
- The composer
- English: The Resurrection and Ascension of Jesus
- Catalogue: Wq 240 / H.777
- Text: Karl Wilhelm Ramler
- Language: German
- Composed: 1774: Hamburg
- Published: 1787
- Vocal: SATB choir and solo soprano, tenor, bass
- Instrumental: orchestra

Die Auferstehung und Himmelfahrt Jesu (The Resurrection and Ascension of Jesus) is an oratorio by Carl Philipp Emanuel Bach to a text by Karl Wilhelm Ramler on the subject of the resurrection and ascension of Jesus Christ. The first documented performance evidently took place in 1774, and was first publicly performed in 1778; it was further revised between 1778 and 1780. Along with the other oratorios that CPE Bach composed, Die Auferstehung und Himmelfahrt Jesu has been described as being "among the most important Protestant vocal works of the second half of the 18th century".

== Background ==
While known mainly for his keyboard works and performance treatises, Carl Philipp Emanuel Bach also composed several oratorios during his career as a composer. These oratorios fall into the category of the late 18th-century German lyric oratorio, where the story is assumed to be known to the listener and the drama is expressed through unnamed 'idealized' personages. The libretto written by Ramler was written in 1760 as the final part of a trilogy of oratorios (the other two being Der Tod Jesu and Die Hirten bei der Krippe zu Bethlehem), and had already been set by Telemann (C.P.E. Bach's godfather and predecessor as musical director to the principal churches (Kapellmeister) of Hamburg) as well as Graun, JF Agricola (1761) and his own younger brother JCF Bach (1771–72). CPE Bach made a few revisions to the libretto in his setting.

CPE Bach first premiered the work in a private performance on Easter Saturday, April 2, 1774. Four years later, a revised edition was performed on March 18, 1778, in the "Auf dem Kamp" concert hall in Hamburg. From its lack of chorales, it seems that the oratorio was composed expressly for a concert hall audience rather than any church congregation. Alongside further revision, Bach negotiated publication with the music publisher Breitkopf in 1787. The work received several performances in 1788 in Vienna, sponsored by Baron van Swieten and conducted by Mozart with some of his own modifications.

The later impact of the work after CPE Bach's death was far-reaching, reaching not only Catholic parts of southern Germany but was also performed occasionally outside the German-speaking world in England and Italy.

== Orchestration ==
The oratorio is written for three solo parts, soprano, tenor, bass; and a four-part (SATB) mixed choir, with the orchestra consisting of strings, two flutes, two oboes (although flutes and oboes are never used in the same number), a bassoon, two horns, three trumpets, timpani and basso continuo.

Flutes are heard in the first chorus (No. 2) and the duet (No. 9). There are obbligato parts for trumpet in the Part I tenor aria (Ich folge dir) and for bassoon in one of the bass arias (Willkommen, Heiland). The final bass aria (Ihr Torre Gottes) is particularly strongly orchestrated, with trumpet and horn fanfares.

== Structure ==
The oratorio consists of 22 numbers, which are divided into two parts of roughly equal length. The first part centres on the resurrection of Jesus, the second centres on the ascension. There are no concrete dramatic roles assigned to the singers, and no dramatic action is described. Instead, the arias and choruses portray sensations, thoughts and feelings that reflect their reactions to Jesus' resurrection and ascension; as a rule, these are linked to the previous recitative. Although Ramler's libretto is partly based on biblical texts, it consists primarily of original poetry; occasionally biblical quotations are interspersed (e.g. the chorus at the end of Part I, No. 12, is a quotation of 1 Corinthians 15:55 "Death, where is thy sting?").

Both parts of the oratorio begin with an introduction played only by the strings, and both end with a choral fugue. There is also a recurring chorus (first in No. 5, then in No. 16 and finally in No. 19) in E-flat major that begins with the word "Triumph" and that is scored with timpani and trumpets in a particularly jubilant setting. The recitatives in the first part, including a verse from Psalm 114, describe the phenomena associated with Jesus' resurrection, the arrival of Archangel Michael (both in No. 3), the entrance of the open grave by the women from Jerusalem (No. 6) and Jesus' meeting with Mary Magdalene (No. 8) and the rest of the women (No. 10). In the second part, the first recitative (No. 14) is unusually long with 43 lines of text and tells of Jesus' encounter with the disciples at Emmaus. The other two recitatives contain the appearance of Jesus before the eleven chosen disciples, the teaching of the unbelieving Thomas (both in No. 17) and the ascension to heaven in the company of his companions (No. 20). The longest number of the oratorio is the closing chorus of praise (No. 22), consisting of on longer, mostly homophonic choral section, and finally a choral fugue on the final words from Psalm 150.

Several recitatives use the "halo of strings" in the recitatives for quotations of Jesus, reminiscent of Bach's father Johann Sebastian's setting of Jesus' voice in the St Matthew Passion, for example in No.8 where Jesus comforts Mary Magdalene. Only one of the six arias is a da capo aria (No. 11), and none uses the dal segno; four of six arias use a modified da capo form A1–B–A2; one (No. 7) has an AB structure, marked allegro – adagio.

Performances generally last 70 to 75 minutes.

== Movements ==
Part I

1. Introduction (orchestral)
2. Chorus (Gott! Du wirst seine Seele)
3. Recitative (Judäa zittert)
4. Aria (Mein Geist voll Furcht und Freuden)
5. Chorus (Triumph! Triumph!)
6. Recitative (Die frommen Töchter)
7. Aria (Wie bang hat dich mein Lied beweint)
8. Recitative (Wer ist die Sionitin)
9. Duet (Vater deiner schwachen Kinder)
10. Recitative (Freundinnen Jesu)
11. Aria (Ich folge dir)
12. Chorus (Tod! Wo ist dein Stachel?)

Part II

13. Introduction (orchestral)
14. Recitative (Dort seh’ ich aus den Toren Jerusalems)
15. Aria (Willkommen, Heiland)
16. Chorus (Triumph! Triumph!)
17. Recitative (Elf auserwählte Jünger)
18. Aria (Mein Herr, mein Gott)
19. Chorus (Triumph! Triumph!)
20. Recitative (Auf einem Hügel)
21. Aria (Ihr Tore Gottes)
22. Chorus (Gott fähret auf mit Jauchzen)

== Discography ==
- Hyperion CDA67364: Ex Tempore, La Petite Bande, Sigiswald Kuijken
- Phoenix PE456: Rheinische Kantorei, Das Kleine Konzert, Hermann Max
- Virgin 0077775906929: Collegium Vocale Gent, Orchestra of the Age of Enlightenment, Philippe Herreweghe
- Passacaille PAS1115: Vlaams Radiokoor, Il Gardellino Baroque Orchestra, Bart Van Reyn
