= Carl Philipp Emanuel Bach =

German composer (1714–1788)

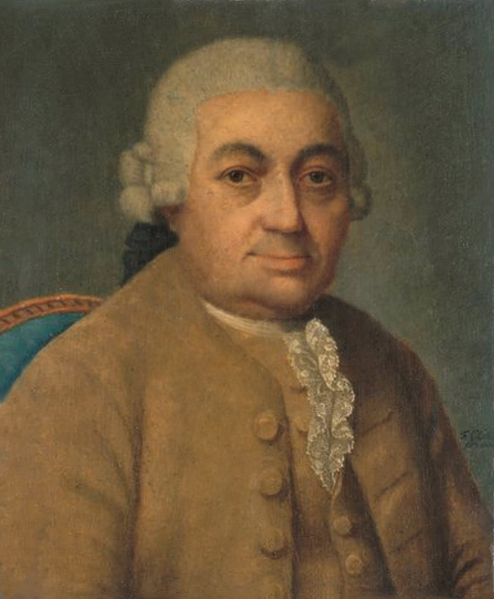
- Born: 8 March 1714; Weimar
- Died: 14 December 1788 (aged 74); Hamburg
- Works: List of compositions
- Parents: Johann Sebastian Bach; Maria Barbara Bach
- Relatives: Bach family

Carl Philipp Emanuel Bach (8 March 1714 – 14 December 1788), commonly abbreviated C. P. E. Bach, was a German composer and musician of the Baroque and Classical eras. He was the fifth child and second surviving son of Johann Sebastian Bach and Maria Barbara Bach.

Bach was an influential composer working at a time of transition between his father's Baroque style and the Classical style that followed it. He was the principal representative of the empfindsamer Stil or 'sensitive style'. The qualities of his keyboard music are forerunners of the expressiveness of Romantic music, in deliberate contrast to the statuesque forms of Baroque music. His organ sonatas mainly come from the galant style.

To distinguish him from his brother Johann Christian, the "London Bach", who at this time was music master to Queen Charlotte of Great Britain, Bach was known as the "Berlin Bach" during his residence in that city, and later as the "Hamburg Bach" when he succeeded Georg Philipp Telemann as Kapellmeister there. To his contemporaries, he was known simply as Emanuel. His second name was in honour of his godfather Telemann, a friend of his father J. S. Bach.

Bach was an influential pedagogue, writing the influential "Essay on the true art of playing keyboard instruments", which would be studied by Joseph Haydn, Wolfgang Amadeus Mozart, and Ludwig van Beethoven, among others.

== Life ==
=== Early years: 1714–1738 ===
C. P. E. Bach was born on 8 March 1714 in Weimar to Johann Sebastian Bach and his first wife, Maria Barbara. His full name, Carl Philipp Emanuel Bach, was formerly spelled Karl Philipp Emmanuel Bach. He was their fifth child and third son. The composer Telemann was his godfather. When he was ten years old, he entered the St. Thomas School, Leipzig, which his father directed as Thomaskantor since 1723. He was one of four Bach children to become professional musicians; all four were trained in music almost entirely by their father. In an age of royal patronage, father and son alike knew that a university education helped prevent a professional musician from being treated as a servant. Carl, like his brothers, pursued advanced studies in jurisprudence at Leipzig University in 1731 and at Frankfurt an der Oder in 1735. In 1738, at the age of 24, he obtained his degree but never practised law, instead immediately turning his attention to music.

=== Berlin years: 1738–1768 ===
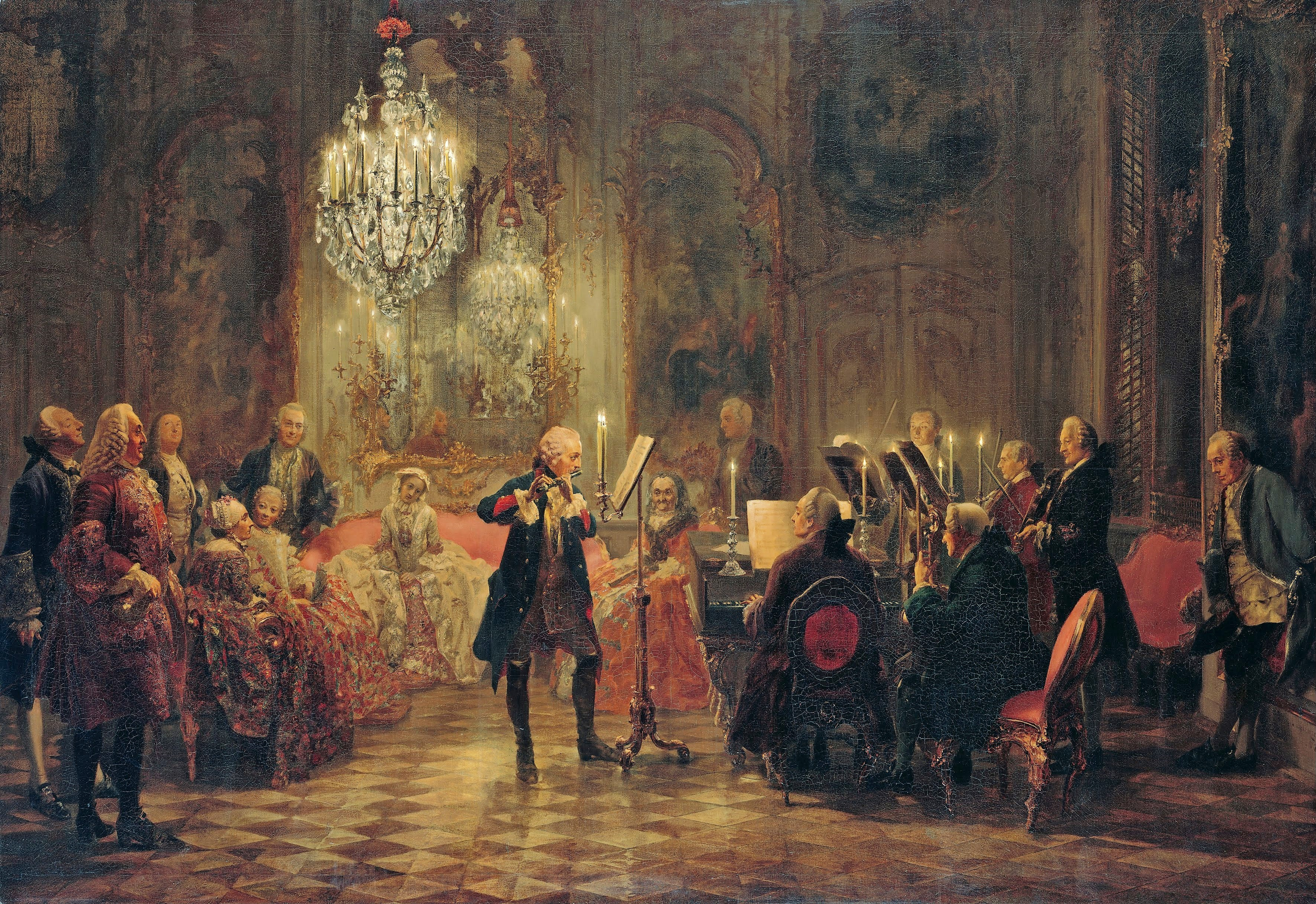
Flötenkonzert Friedrichs des Großen in Sanssouci ("Frederick the Great's Flute Concert in Sanssouci") by Adolph von Menzel, 1852, depicts Frederick the Great playing the flute as C. P. E. Bach accompanies on the keyboard. The audience (invented by Menzel, and not based on any actual occasion) includes Bach's colleagues as well as nobles.

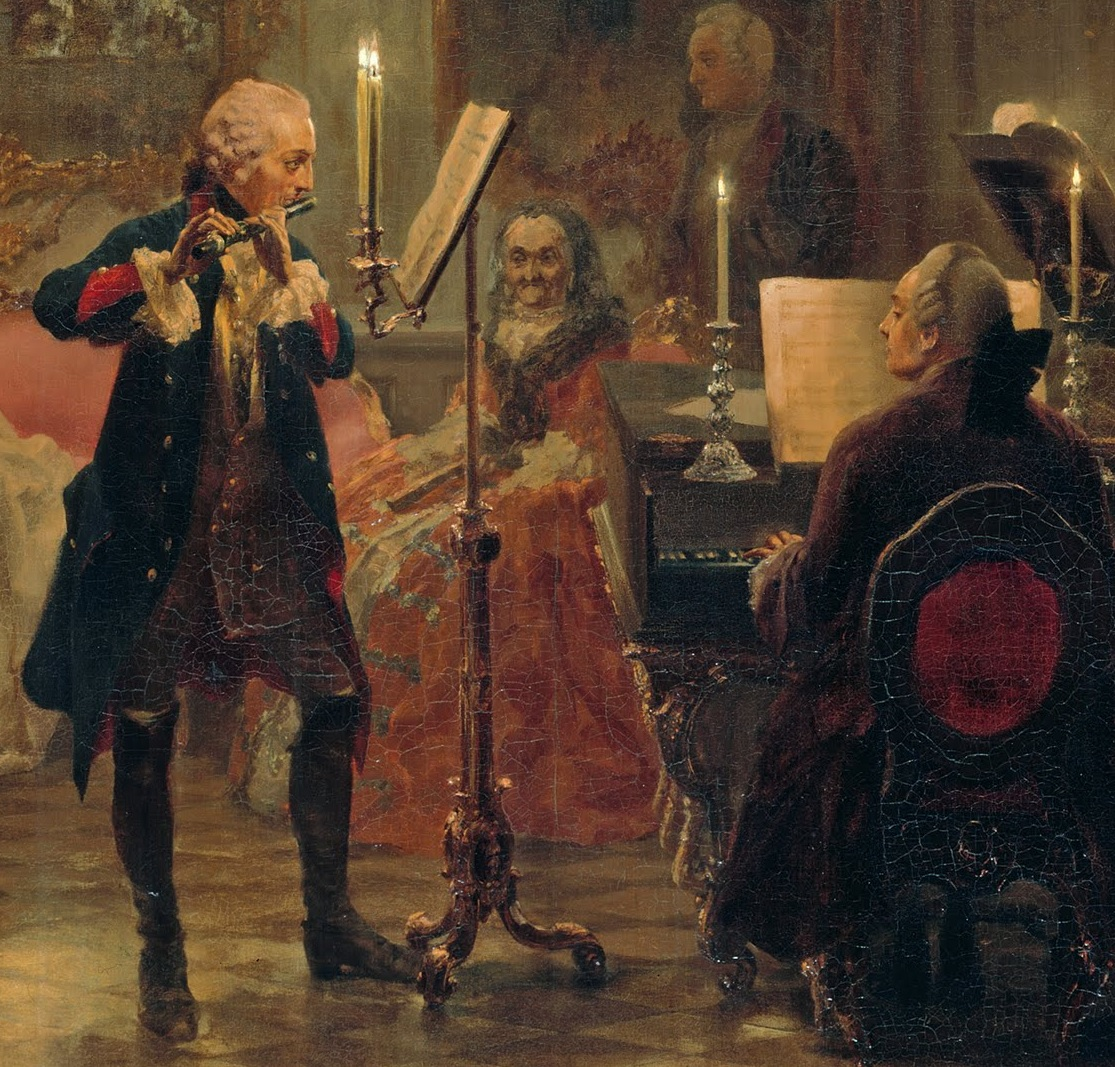
Detail from previous image

A few months after graduation, with a recommendation by the Graun brothers (Johann Gottlieb and Carl Heinrich) and Sylvius Leopold Weiss, Bach obtained an appointment at Berlin in the service of Crown Prince Frederick of Prussia, the future Frederick the Great. Upon Frederick's accession in 1740, Bach became a member of the royal orchestra. He was by this time one of the foremost clavier players in Europe, and his compositions, which date from 1731, include about thirty sonatas and concert pieces for harpsichord and clavichord. During his time there, Berlin was a rich artistic environment, where Bach mixed with many accomplished musicians, including several notable former students of his father, and important literary figures, such as Gotthold Ephraim Lessing, with whom the composer would become close friends.

In Berlin, Bach continued to write numerous pieces for solo keyboard, including a series of character pieces, the so-called "Berlin Portraits", including "La Caroline". His reputation was established by the two sets of sonatas which he published with dedications to Frederick the Great (1742) and Charles Eugene, Duke of Württemberg (1744). In 1746, he was promoted to the post of chamber musician (Kammermusikus) and served the king alongside colleagues like Carl Heinrich Graun, Johann Joachim Quantz, and Franz Benda.

The composer who most influenced Bach's maturing style was unquestionably his father. He drew creative inspiration from his godfather Georg Philipp Telemann, then working in Hamburg, and from contemporaries like George Frideric Handel, Carl Heinrich Graun, Haydn, and Mozart later. Bach's interest in all types of art led to influence from poets, playwrights and philosophers such as Friedrich Gottlieb Klopstock, Moses Mendelssohn and Lessing. Bach's work itself influenced the work of, among others, Haydn, Mozart, Beethoven, and Felix Mendelssohn.

During his residence in Berlin, Bach composed a Magnificat (1749), in which he shows more traces than usual of his father's influence; a cantata for Easter (1756); several symphonies and concert works; at least three volumes of songs, including the celebrated Gellert Songs; and a few secular cantatas and other occasional pieces. But his main work was concentrated on the clavier, for which he composed, at this time, nearly two hundred sonatas and other solos, including the set Mit veränderten Reprisen (With Varied Reprises, 1760–1768).

While in Berlin, Bach placed himself in the forefront of European music with a treatise, Versuch über die wahre Art das Clavier zu spielen (An Essay on the True Art of Playing Keyboard Instruments), immediately recognised as a definitive work on keyboard technique. "Both Haydn and Beethoven swore by it." By 1780, the book was in its third edition and laid the foundation for the keyboard methods of Clementi and Cramer. The essay lays out the fingering for each chord and some chord sequences. Bach's techniques continue to be employed today. The first part of the Essay contains a chapter explaining the various embellishments in work of the period, e.g., trills, turns, mordents, etc. The second part presents Bach's ideas on the art of figured bass and counterpoint, as well as performance suggestions and a brief section on extemporization, mainly focusing on the Fantasia.

Bach used for his performances instruments (clavichord and fortepiano) made by Gottfried Silbermann, at that time a well-known builder of keyboard instruments. In the recent years one of the models of pianos that Bach was playing, the Gottfried Silbermann 1749, was used as a model for making modern piano copies.

=== Hamburg: 1768–1788 ===
In 1768, after protracted negotiations, Bach was permitted to relinquish his position in order to succeed his godfather Telemann as director of music (Kapellmeister) at Hamburg. Upon his release from service at the court, he was named court composer for Frederick's sister, Princess Anna Amalia. The title was honorary, but her patronage and interest in the oratorio genre may have played a role in nurturing the ambitious choral works that followed.

Bach began to turn more of his energy to ecclesiastical and choral music in his new position. The job required the steady production of music for Protestant church services at the Michaeliskirche (Church of St. Michael) and elsewhere in Hamburg. The following year he produced his most ambitious work, the oratorio Die Israeliten in der Wüste (The Israelites in the Desert), a composition remarkable not only for its "great beauty" but for the resemblance of its plan to that of Mendelssohn's Elijah. Between 1768 and 1788, he wrote twenty-one settings of the Passion, and some seventy cantatas, litanies, motets, and other liturgical pieces. In 1773, Bach wrote an autobiography: he was one of the first composers to write such an account of his life. In Hamburg he also presented a number of works by contemporaries, including his father, Telemann, Graun, Handel, Haydn, Mozart, Salieri and Johann David Holland (1746–1827). Bach's choral output reached its apex in two works: the double chorus Heilig (Holy) of 1776, a setting of the seraph song from the throne scene in Isaiah, and an oratorio known as Die Auferstehung und Himmelfahrt Jesu (The Resurrection and Ascension of Jesus) of 1774–1782, which sets a poetic Gospel harmonization by the poet Karl Wilhelm Ramler. Widespread admiration of Auferstehung led to three 1788 performances in Vienna sponsored by the Baron Gottfried van Swieten and conducted by Mozart.

Bach married Johanna Maria Dannemann (1724–1795) in 1744. Only three of their children lived to adulthood: Johann Adam (1745–1789), Anna Carolina Philippina (1747–1804), and Johann Sebastian "the Younger" (1748–1778). None became musicians, and Johann Sebastian, a promising painter, died at the age of 29 during a 1778 trip to Italy. Emanuel Bach died in Hamburg on 14 December 1788. He was buried in the Michaeliskirche in Hamburg.

== Works ==
Sonatas by C. P. E. Bach
Flute Sonata in B♭ major
Performed by Alex Murray (flute) and Martha Goldstein (harpsichord)

Sonata for Flute or Recorder and Harpsichord in G minor, H 542.5 (BWV 1020) – I. Allegro

Sonata, H 542.5 – II. Adagio

Sonata, H 542.5 – III. Allegro
All performed by Alex Murray (traverso) and Martha Goldstein (harpsichord)

Flute Sonata in G major
Performed by Alex Murray (flute) and Martha Goldstein (harpsichord)

Keyboard Sonata in D minor, Wq. 51/4, H.128 – I. Allegro assai
Performed by Christopher Hinterhuber (piano)

Other music by C. P. E. Bach
Solfeggietto

Freie Fantasie, F♯ minor
Performed by Joan Benson (clavichord)

Flute Concerto in G major, H. 445 – I. Allegro
Performed by the Advent Chamber Orchestra with Constance Schoepflin (flute)

H. 445 – II. Largo
Performed by the Advent Chamber Orchestra with Constance Schoepflin (flute)

H. 445 – III. Presto
Performed by the Advent Chamber Orchestra with Constance Schoepflin (flute)

=== In the Notebook for Anna Magdalena Bach ===
Works C. P. E. Bach wrote in the Notebook for Anna Magdalena Bach are: March in D major, BWV Anh. 122; Polonaise in G minor, BWV Anh. 123; March in G major, BWV Anh. 124; Polonaise in G minor, BWV Anh. 125; and "Solo per il cembalo", BWV Anh. 129.

=== Symphonies ===
Among Bach's most popular and frequently recorded works are his symphonies. While in Berlin, he wrote several string symphonies (Wq. 173–181), most of which were later revised to add parts for wind instruments. Of these, the E minor symphony, Wq. 178, has been particularly popular.

In Hamburg, Bach wrote a major set of six string symphonies for Gottfried van Swieten, Wq. 182 of 1773. These works were not published in his lifetime (van Swieten, who had commissioned them to be written in a more "difficult" style, preferred to retain them for private use), but since their rediscovery, have become increasingly popular.

However, Bach's best works in the form (by his own estimation) are assuredly the four Orchester-Sinfonien mit zwölf obligaten Stimmen, Wq. 183, which, as their title suggests, were written with obbligato wind parts that are integral to the texture, rather than being added on to an older string symphony. The first symphony (D major) in the set has been particularly popular, seeing a continuous performance and publication tradition all the way through the 19th century, which makes it the earliest such symphony. Some of its more unusual features have been taken as characteristic of Bach's style: the work, although it is in D major, begins on a D major chord, which then turns into a D dominant-seventh chord, outlining G major. In fact, there is no cadence on D major (D major is not "confirmed" as the key of the piece) until the beginning of the recapitulation, quite late in the piece.

=== Concertos ===
Bach was a prolific writer of concertos, especially for keyboard. Like his father, he would often transcribe a concerto for various instruments, leading to problems determining which came first. For instance, the three cello concertos (Wq. 170–172), which are cornerstones of that instrument's repertoire, have often been considered to be transcriptions of the harpsichord versions, but recent research has suggested that they might be originally for cello.

According to Bach, his finest keyboard concertos were the Sei concerti per il cembalo concertato, Wq. 43, which were written to be somewhat more appealing, and somewhat easier to play. His other concertos were written for oboe, flute, and organ. Bach also wrote for more unusual combinations, including an E♭ major concerto for harpsichord and piano. Additionally, he wrote several sonatinas for one or more keyboards and orchestra.

=== Chamber music ===
Bach's chamber music forms something of a bridge between stereotypically Baroque and Classical forms. On the one hand, he wrote trio sonatas and solo sonatas with basso continuo (including ones for harp and viola da gamba); on the other, he wrote several accompanied sonatas for piano, violin, and cello, which are more or less early piano trios, and three very popular quartets for keyboard, flute, and viola. Bach also wrote one of the earliest pieces for solo flute, a sonata that is clearly influenced by his father's Partita in A minor for solo flute, BWV 1013.

=== Keyboard sonatas ===
Bach was a prolific writer of keyboard sonatas, many of which were intended for his favored instrument, the clavichord. During his lifetime, he published more collections of keyboard music than anything else, in the following collections:

- Sei sonate per cembalo che all' augusta maestà di Federico II, re di Prussia, 1742 ("Prussian" sonatas), Wq. 48.
- Sei sonate per cembalo, dedicate all' altezza serenissima di Carlo Eugenio, duca di Wirtemberg, 1744 ("Württemberg" sonatas), Wq. 49.
- Achtzehn Probe-Stücke in Sechs Sonaten, 1753 ("Probestücke" sonatas), Wq. 63.
- Sechs Sonaten fürs Clavier mit veränderten Reprisen, 1760 ("Reprisen" sonatas), Wq. 50.
- Fortsetzung von Sechs Sonaten fürs Clavier, 1761 ("Fortsetzung" sonatas), Wq. 51.
- Zweite Fortsetzung von Sechs Sonaten fürs Clavier, 1763 ("Zweite Fortsetzung" sonatas), Wq. 52.
- Sechs Leichte Clavier Sonaten, 1766 ("Leichte" sonatas), Wq. 53.
- Six Sonates pour le Clavecin à l'usage des Dames, 1770 ("Damen" sonatas), Wq. 54.
- Six collections of Clavier Sonaten für Kenner und Liebhaber, 1779–87 ("Kenner und Liebhaber" sonatas), Wq. 55–59, 61.

Much of Bach's energy during his last years was dedicated to the publication of the "Kenner und Liebhaber" collections (which also include fantasias and rondos, see below).

Wq. 64:1–6 are six sonatinas for keyboard, and Wq. 65:1–50 are fifty further keyboard sonatas. The Sonata in E♭ major, Wq. 65:7, is based on Solo per il cembalo, BWV Anh. III 129, No. 27 in the second Notebook for Anna Magdalena Bach.

=== Other keyboard works ===
Bach's best-known piece is the Solfeggietto, Wq. 117/2, to the point that the introduction to The Essential C. P. E. Bach is subtitled "Beyond the Solfeggio in C Minor". Several of Bach's other miscellaneous keyboard works have gained fame, including the character piece La Caroline and the Fantasia in F♯ minor, Wq. 67. Bach's fantasias, in particular, have been considered to show him at his most characteristic: they are full of dramatic silences, harmonic surprises, and perpetually varied figuration.

Bach published three major collections of miscellaneous keyboard works during his lifetime: the Clavierstücke verschiedener Art, Wq. 112 of 1765, and the Kurze und Leichte Clavierstücke collections, Wq. 113–114 of 1766. The former includes songs, fantasias, dances, sonatas, fugues, and even a symphony and concerto for solo piano (Bach later published an entire collection of keyboard versions of his symphonies).

He also wrote a set of six sonatas for the organ of Frederick the Great's sister Anna Amalia.

=== Music for mechanical instruments ===
Stücke für Spieluhren auch Drehorgeln [pieces for music boxes and barrel organs]
Tune for musical clock in D major, Wq. 193/02

Tune for musical clock in C minor, Wq. 193/04

Tune for musical clock in E major, Wq. 193/06

Tune for musical clock in B major, Wq. 193/08

Tune for musical clock, Wq. 193/11

Tune for music box, Wq. 193/12

Mechanical instruments such as the music box and musical clock were popular at the Prussian court, and C. P. E. Bach wrote thirty original compositions for these instruments, grouped together as Wq. 193. At that time, Bach was court musician to King Frederick the Great at Potsdam; the King, who was intrigued by mechanically reproduced music, had mechanical organ clocks built for the City Castle of Potsdam and for the New Palais.

=== Choral works ===
Throughout his lifetime, Bach worked on the Magnificat in D, Wq. 215. J. S. Bach was alive to hear it in 1749, and C. P. E. continued to revise and perform it as late as 1786. The work clearly shows the influence of J.S. Bach's own Magnificat, including the striking resemblance of the Deposuit movements in both works.

His other important choral works include the Heilig (German Sanctus), Wq. 217, which he performed together with the Credo from his Father's Mass in B minor, the oratorios Die Israeliten in der Wüste, Wq. 238 and Die Auferstehung und Himmelfahrt Jesu, Wq. 240, and 21 Passions.

== Unpublished works ==
Many of C. P. E. Bach's compositions and original manuscripts were stored in the archive of the Sing-Akademie zu Berlin where Bach lived from 1738 to 1768. This archive was packed during the Second World War and hidden to preserve it from Allied bombing, captured and sequestered by USSR forces in 1945, thus long believed lost or destroyed during the war.

The archive was discovered in Kyiv, Ukraine, in 1999, returned to Berlin in 2001, and deposited in the Berlin State Library. It contained 5,100 musical compositions, none ever printed for the public, including 500 by 12 different members of the Bach family.

== Legacy and musical style ==
Through the later half of the 18th century, the reputation of Carl Philipp Emanuel Bach stood very high, surpassing that of his father. Haydn, Mozart and Beethoven admired him and "avidly" collected his music. Mozart said of him, "Bach is the father, we are the children." (Note: Rochlitz (1824–1832), pp. 308 ff quoted in Ottenberg (1987), p. 98 & 191)

His work has been described as "sincere in thought" and "polished and felicitous in phrase". His keyboard sonatas, for example, "mark an important epoch in the history of musical form". "Lucid in style, delicate and tender in expression, they are even more notable for the freedom and variety of their structural design"; they break away altogether from the hardened conventions of the Italian school.

He was probably the first composer of eminence who made free use of harmonic color for its own sake. In this way, he compares well with the most important representatives of the First Viennese School. He exerted enormous influence on the North German School of composers, in particular Georg Anton Benda, Bernhard Joachim Hagen, Ernst Wilhelm Wolf, Johann Gottfried Müthel, and Friedrich Wilhelm Rust. His influence was not limited to his contemporaries and extended to Mendelssohn and Carl Maria von Weber.

His name fell into neglect during the 19th century, with Robert Schumann notoriously opining that "as a creative musician he remained very far behind his father"; others opined that he was "a somewhat feeble imitator of his father's style". All the same, Johannes Brahms held him in high regard and edited some of his music. By the early 20th century, he was better regarded but the revival of C. P. E. Bach's works has been chiefly underway since Helmuth Koch's recordings of his symphonies and Hugo Ruf's recordings of his keyboard sonatas in the 1960s. There is an ongoing project to record his complete works, led by Miklós Spányi on the Swedish record label BIS. In 2014, the Croatian pianist Ana-Marija Markovina, in cooperation with the Packard Humanities Institute, the Bach-Archiv Leipzig, the Sächsische Akademie der Wissenschaften zu Leipzig and Harvard University released a 26-CD box set of the complete works for solo piano on the German record label Hänssler Classic, performed on a modern Bösendorfer grand piano.

The works of C. P. E. Bach are known by "Wq" numbers, from Alfred Wotquenne's 1906 catalogue, and by "H" numbers from a catalogue by Eugene Helm (1989).

He was portrayed by Wolfgang Liebeneiner in the 1941 biopic of his brother Friedemann Bach.

The street Carl-Philipp-Emanuel-Bach-Straße in Frankfurt (Oder) is named after him.

The Musikgymnasium Carl Philipp Emanuel Bach in Berlin, a special school for talented musicians, is named after him.

2014 marked the 300th anniversary of Carl Philipp Emanuel Bach's birth. All six German Bach cities—Hamburg, Potsdam, Berlin, Frankfurt-on-the-Oder, Leipzig, and Weimar—hosted concerts and other events to commemorate the anniversary.

In 2015 the Carl Philipp Emanuel Bach Museum was opened in Hamburg.

== See also ==
- Carl Philipp Emanuel Bach Chamber Orchestra
- Carl Philipp Emanuel Bach: The Complete Works
