= Christoph Christian Sturm =

German preacher and author (1740–1786)

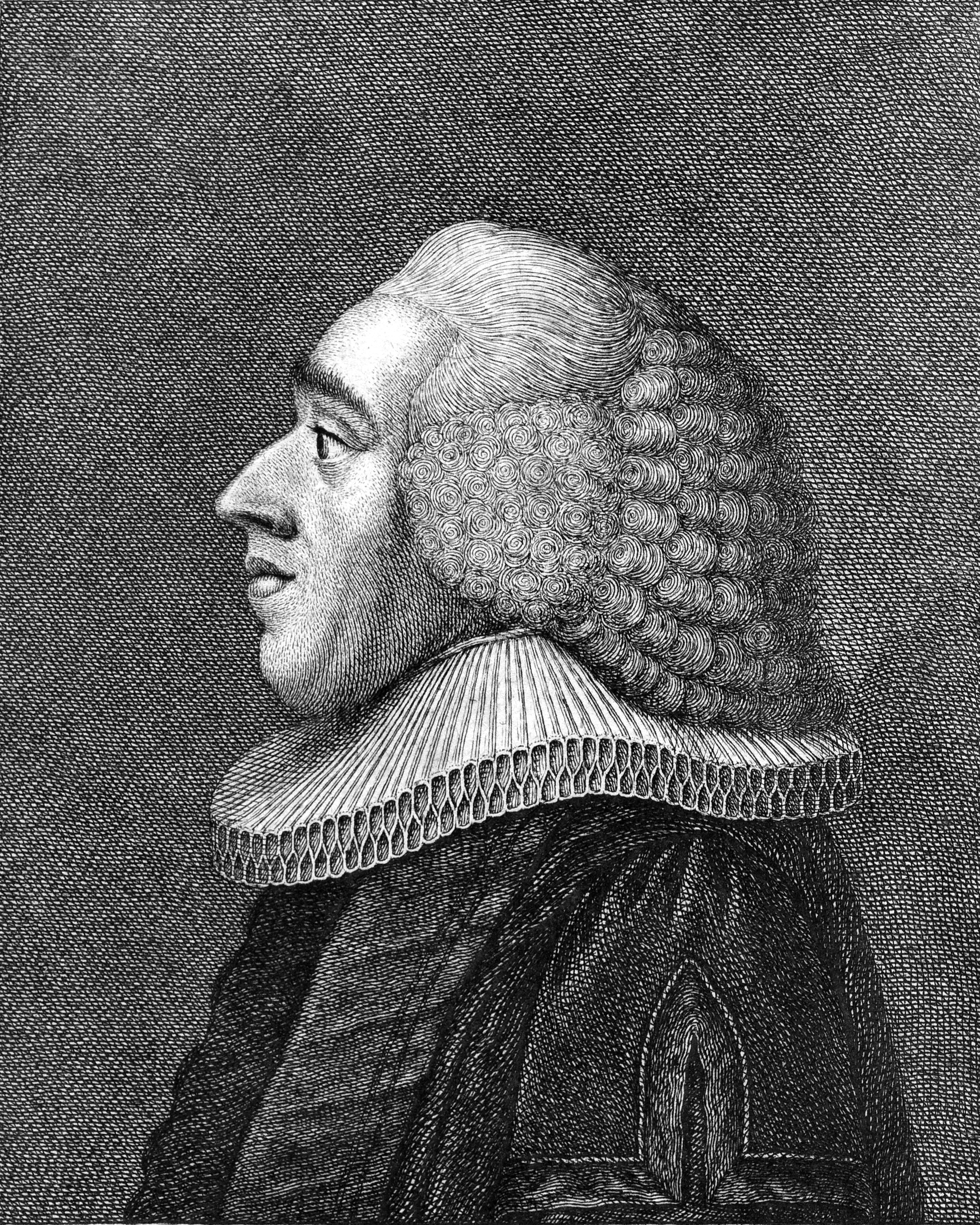
Christoph Christian Sturm

Christoph Christian Sturm (1740–1786) was a German preacher and author, best known for his Reflections on the Works of God in Nature. The son of Johann Jakob Sturm, a lawyer, at Augsburg, was born at Augsburg, January 25, 1740. He studied at the universities of Jena and Halle. He was then appointed, in 1762, as one of the masters in the Paedagogium at Halle, and in 1765 became Conrector of the school at Sorau, at that time still part of Brandenburg.

In 1767 he returned to Halle as fourth pastor of the Market Church, and became third pastor in the same year. He left Halle in 1769, to become second pastor of the church of the Holy Spirit (Heilige-Geist-Kirche) at Magdeburg, where he passed the happiest part of his professional life, and where he wrote most of his devotional works. Finally, in 1778, he was appointed chief pastor of St. Peter's Church at Hamburg. Here he at first lived happily, beloved and respected as a preacher and author, until, in 1782, his views on the Salvation of the Heathen led J. M. Goetze, chief pastor of St. Katherine's Church in Hamburg, to accuse him of nationalism. The resulting controversy embittered and shortened Sturm's life. In his latter years he suffered from a weak chest; and in the night of August 10, 1786, he was seized with an attack of spitting of blood, from which he never recovered. He died at Hamburg, on August 26, 1786.

== Legacy ==
Sturm's works have been translated into numerous different languages and are still in use today. Beethoven owned a copy of the Reflections on the Works of God in Nature, which he annotated extensively.
