= Alfred Wotquenne =

Belgian musical bibliographer (1867–1939)

- Born: 25 January 1867; Lobbes, Hainault, Belgium
- Died: 25 September 1939 (aged 72)
- Occupation: Biographer

Alfred Wotquenne (French: [wɔtkɛn]; 25 January 1867 – 25 September 1939) was a Belgian musical bibliographer, best known for his catalogues of the works of Carl Philipp Emanuel Bach and Christoph Willibald Gluck.

== Biography ==
Wotquenne was born in Lobbes, Hainault, Belgium. He studied at Brussels' Conservatoire Royal, where his teachers included Louis Brassin (piano), Alphonse Mailly (organ), and François-Auguste Gevaert (theory). In 1894 he was appointed the chief librarian of the conservatoire; he retained this post until his arrest in 1918. During his time the library acquired a great many works, both printed and in manuscript.

The best known of Wotquenne's achievements is his 1905 bibliographical study of Carl Philipp Emanuel Bach, but he also performed similar services for other composers: Baldassare Galuppi (1900), Christoph Willibald Gluck (1905), and Luigi Rossi (1909). He also contributed to a complete inventory of the works of a fellow-Belgian, the Liège-born André Grétry.

Thanks to Wotquenne's efforts, C. P. E. Bach's pieces came to be known by their "Wq" numbers. They are now also known by their "H" numbers, from a new and more thorough catalogue by Eugene Helm (1989). A concordance between these systems is available.

== Conviction ==
He was arrested in 1918, and convicted for "participating with the enemy". By royal decree he lost the Order of Leopold and his position as chief librarian on 9 August 1919.

From 1921 Wotquenne lived in France, working in Antibes as a choir master and organ teacher. He died at Antibes shortly after the outbreak of World War II.

== Publications ==
- Catalogue thématique des œuvres de Chr. W. v. Gluck. Breitkopf & Härtel, Leipzig 1904
- Catalogue thématique des œuvres de Charles Philippe Emmanuel Bach (1714–1788). Breitkopf & Härtel, Leipzig 1905
