= Hugo Ruf =

German harpsichordist and music pedagogue

Hugo Ruf (born 9 April 1925 in Schramberg/Württemberg, died 1 November 1999 in Brauweiler near Cologne) was an influential German harpsichordist, music pedagogue and a pioneer of early music revival in Germany. He is noted in particular for his recordings of music by Carl Philipp Emmanuel Bach. He was instrumental (along with the conductor Helmuth Koch) in the 20th century revival of C.P.E.Bach's music.

== Biography ==
Ruf studied harpsichord at the Hochschule für Musik Freiburg since 1946. From 1967 until 1990, he taught at the Cologne School of Music, since 1971 as a lifetime professor. He was director of the Seminary for old Music.

== Web ==
- Website Schott music
