= Liebster Gott, wenn werd ich sterben, BWV 8 =

Church cantata by J.S. Bach

Liebster Gott, wenn werd ich sterben?
- BWV 8
- Chorale cantata by J. S. Bach
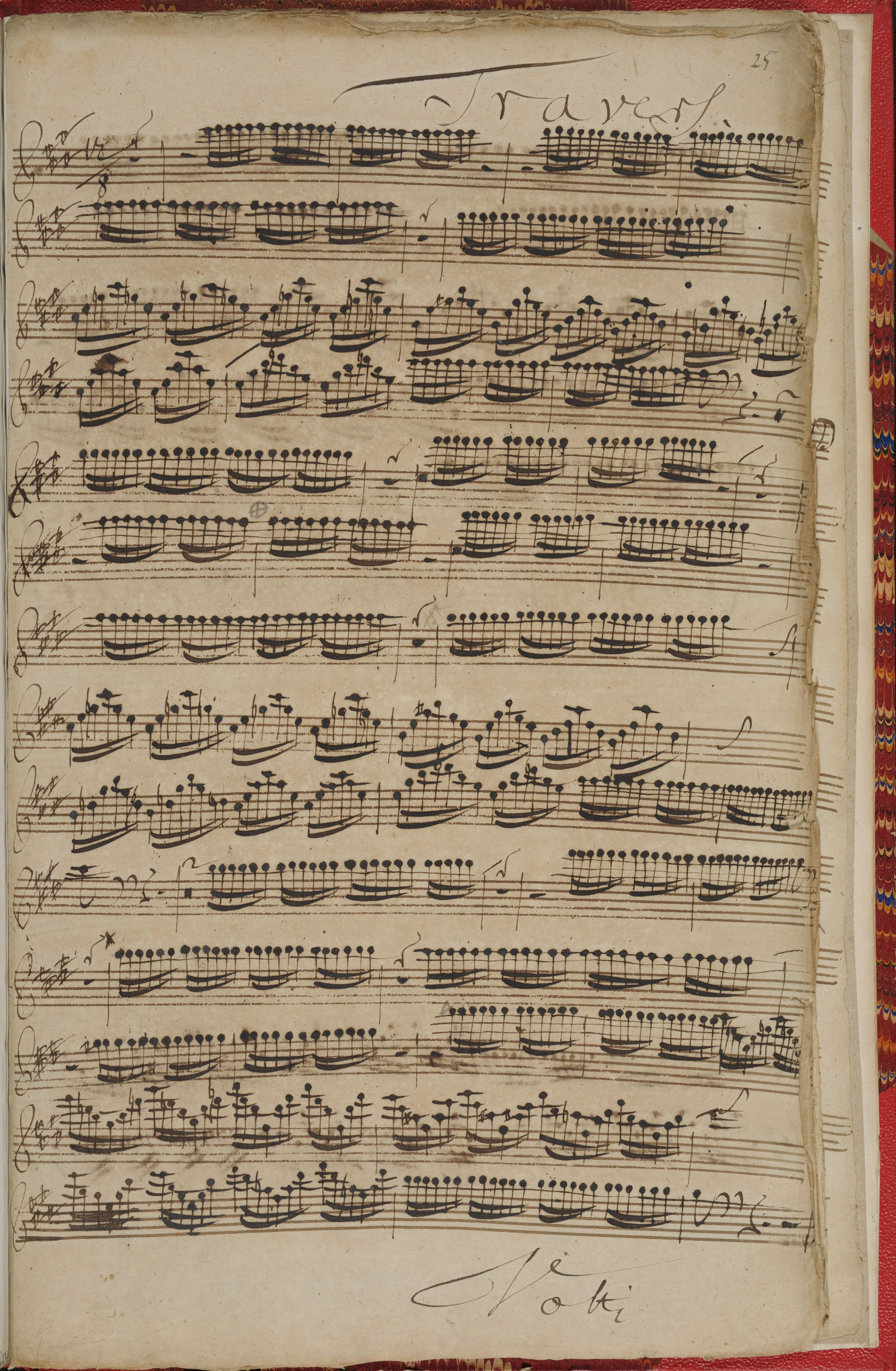
- Obbligato transverse flute part for the first performance of the cantata
- Occasion: 16th Sunday after Trinity
- Based on: "Liebster Gott, wann werd ich sterben" (setting by Daniel Vetter)
- Performed: 24 September 1724: Leipzig
- Movements: 6
- Vocal: SATB choir and soloists
- Instrumental: horn or taille; traverso or piccolo; 2 oboes d'amore; strings; continuo

Liebster Gott, wenn werd ich sterben? (lit. 'Dearest God, when will I die?'), BWV 8, is a church cantata for the 16th Sunday after Trinity by Johann Sebastian Bach. It is a chorale cantata, part of Bach's second cantata cycle. Bach performed it for the first time on 24 September 1724 in St. Nicholas Church in Leipzig. The cantata is scored for SATB singers, four wind instruments, strings and continuo.

The text of the cantata is a reflection on death, based on "Liebster Gott, wann werd ich sterben", a Lutheran hymn in five stanzas which Caspar Neumann wrote around 1690. Bach adapted Daniel Vetter's setting of this hymn, composed in the early 1690s and first printed in 1713, in the cantata's first and last movements. The opening movement is a chorale fantasia, an extensive instrumental piece, punctuated by the four-part choir, who sing line by line from the first stanza of Neumann's hymn. The last movement, the closing chorale, is a version of Vetter's 1713 four-part setting Liebster Gott, borrowed and reworked by Bach. The four other movements of the cantata, a succession of arias and recitatives, were composed by Bach for vocal and instrumental soloists. The anonymous libretto for these movements is an expanded paraphrase of the second to fourth stanzas of Neumann's hymn.

Bach revived the cantata in the 1730s, and, after transposing it from E major to D major, in the late 1740s. After Bach's death, the cantata was revived again in Leipzig, in the mid-1750s. The vocal parts of its closing chorale were published in the second half of the 18th century, in Birnstiel's and Breitkopf's collections of four-part chorales by Bach. The Bach Gesellschaft (BG) published the cantata in 1851, in the first volume of their collected edition of Bach's works. John Troutbeck's translation, When will God recall my spirit?, was published in a vocal score a few decades later. Both the E major and D major versions of the cantata were published in the New Bach Edition (NBE) in 1982.

Commentators have agreed in their praise for the cantata: William G. Whittaker wrote that, "Few cantatas are so wholly attractive and so individual as this lovely work"; Alfred Dürr has written that, "The opening chorus presents the listener with a sublime vision of the hour of death"; and Arnold Schering states that, "The opening movement of the cantata must be ranked as one of the most arresting tone-pictures ever penned by Bach." There have been many recordings of the cantata, starting with that by Karl Richter in 1959. In the 1970s there were more recordings of BWV 8 along with all of Bach's cantatas—on modern instruments by Helmuth Rilling and on period instruments by Gustav Leonhardt and Nikolaus Harnoncourt. Later recordings include those by Joshua Rifkin, Philippe Herreweghe, Ton Koopman and John Eliot Gardiner.

== Compositional history ==
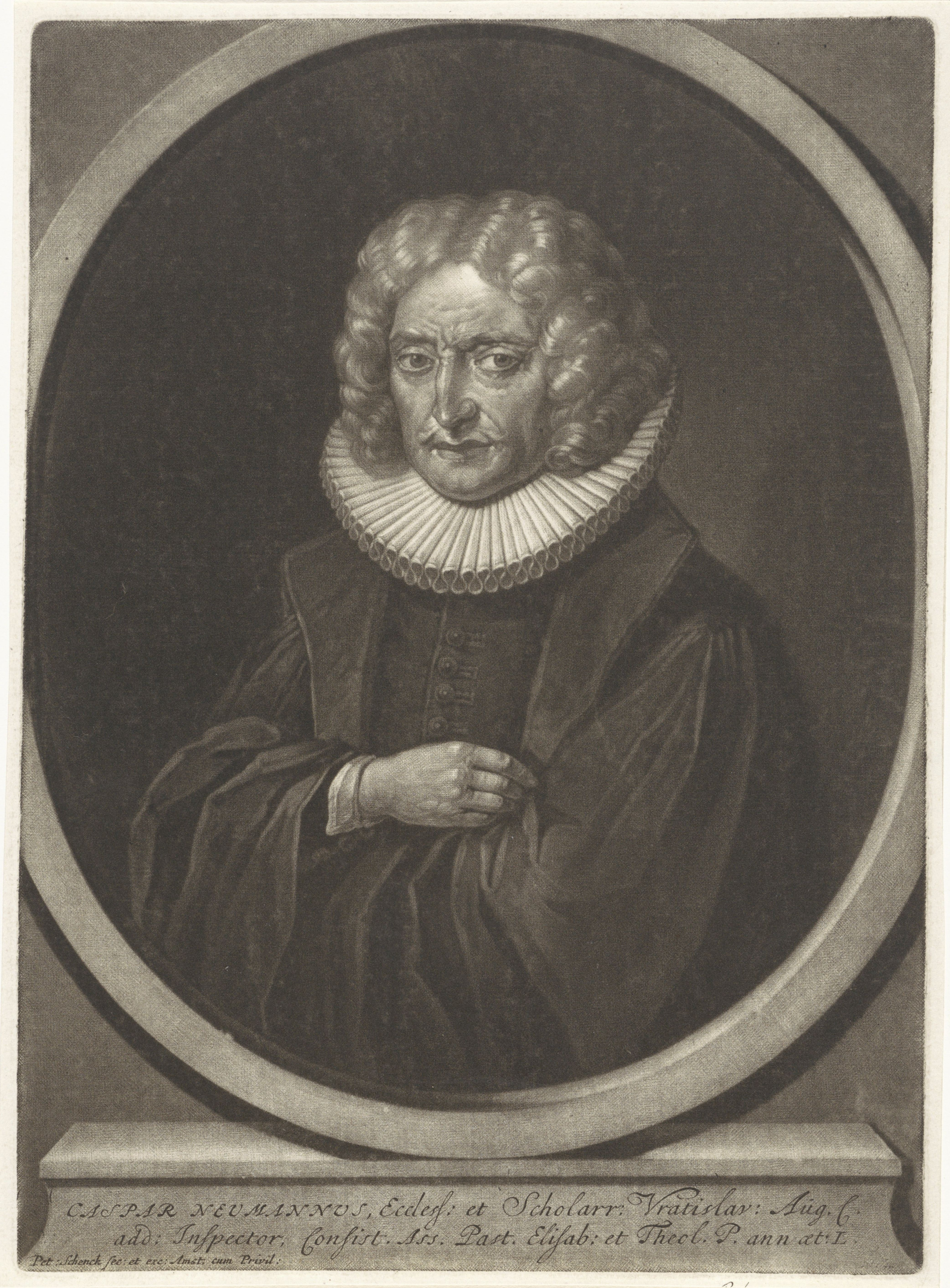
Caspar Neumann, writer of the hymn

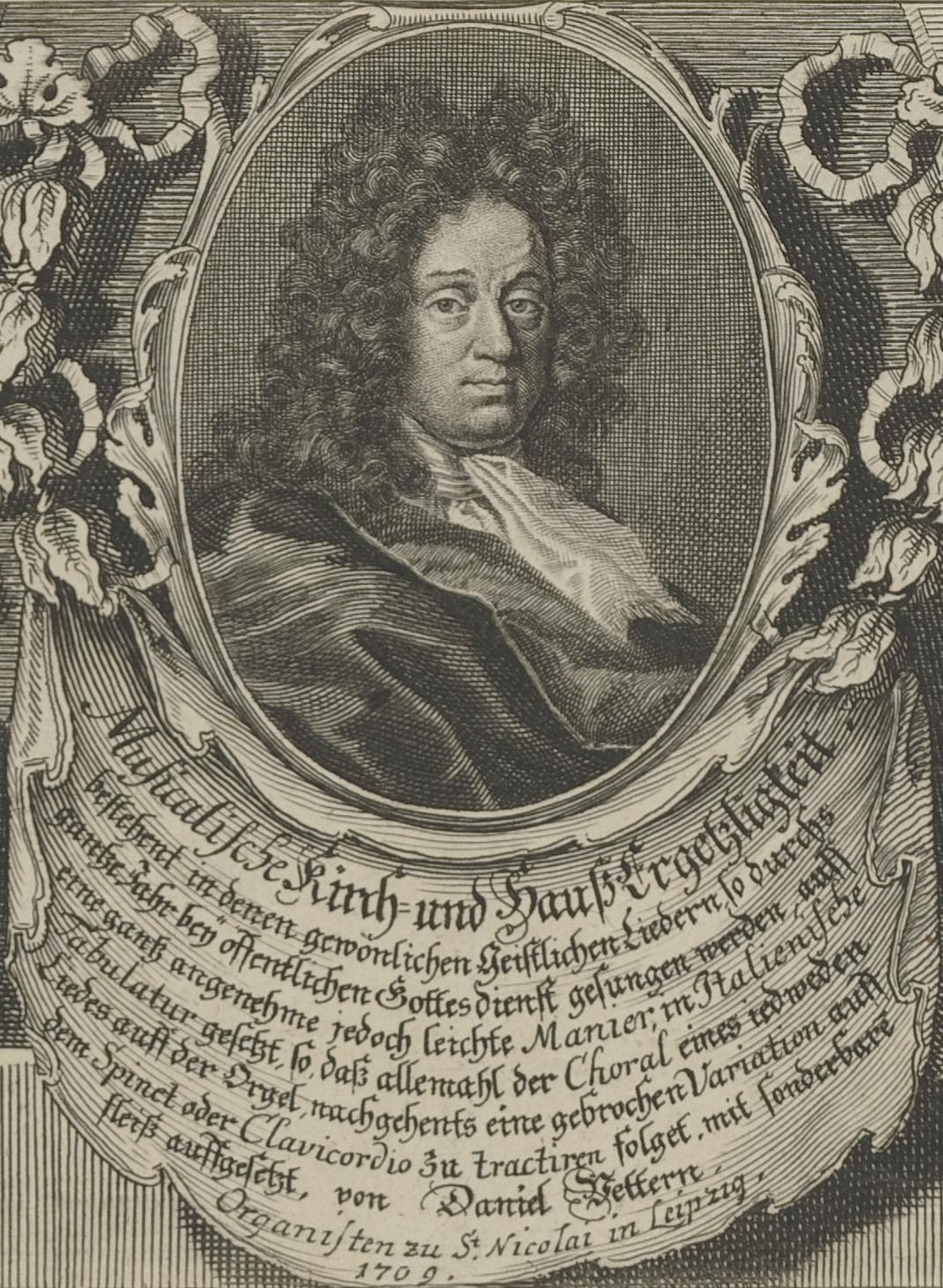
Daniel Vetter, composer of the hymn

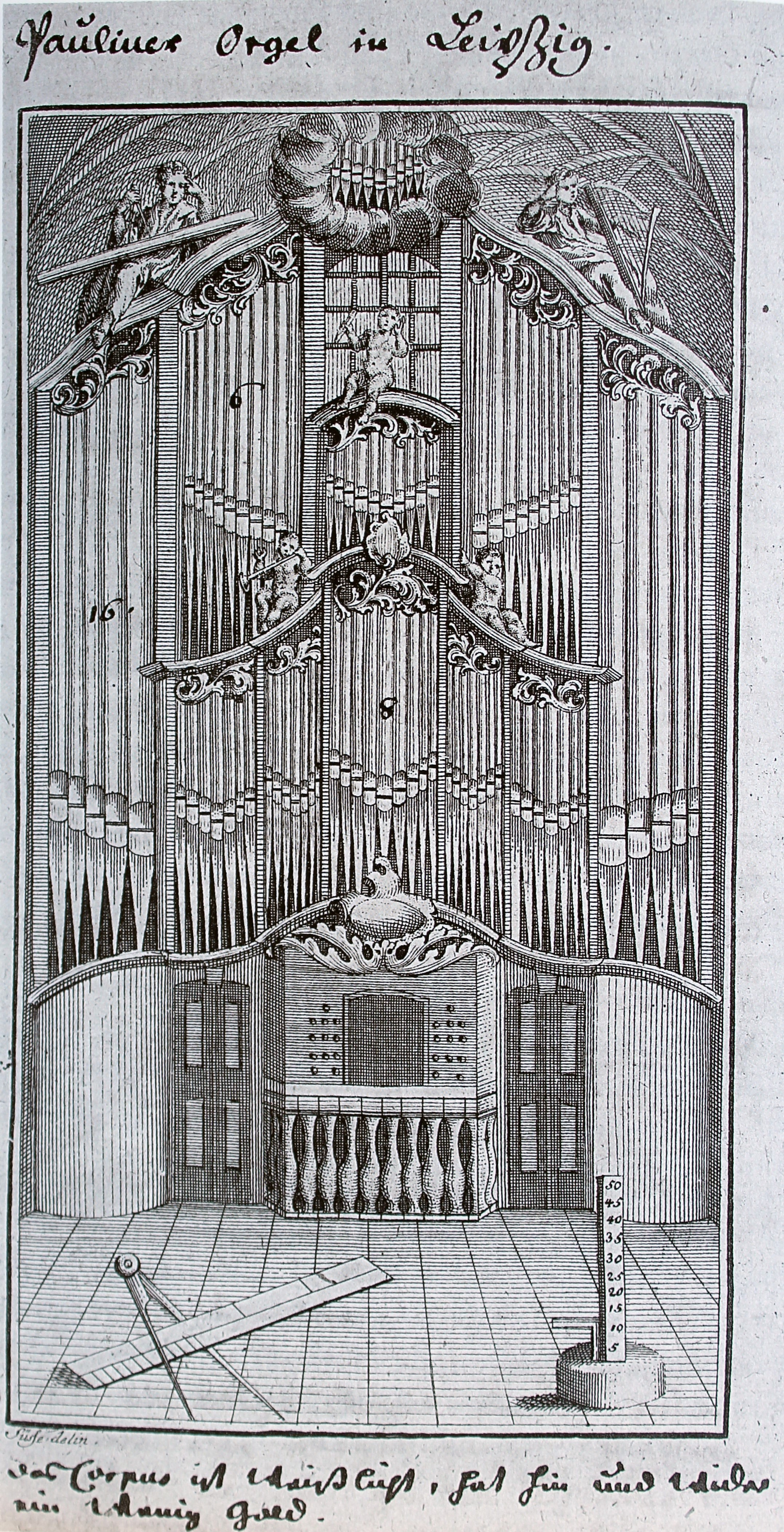
J. A. Silbermann, engraving c. 1720. Johann Scheibe's organ in St Paul's Church, Leipzig, rebuilt 1710–1716 under Vetter's supervision and evaluated by Bach in 1717.

=== Background ===
All of Bach's cantatas for the Trinity XVI occasion meditate on death, a theme linked to the Gospel reading. In Bach's day, a common interpretation of the Gospel reading was that it prefigured Christ resurrecting the faithful to eternal life, and in this sense the reading inspired a longing for death: an early death meant one would be sooner close to this desired resurrection. Two cantatas for the Trinity XVI occasion, composed by Bach before BWV 8, take this approach on the theme of death:

- Komm, du süße Todesstunde, BWV 161, first performed in Weimar on 27 September 1716.
- Christus, der ist mein Leben, BWV 95, composed in Leipzig, a year before BWV 8, and first performed on 12 September 1723.

The second of these two cantatas was composed in Bach's first year as Thomaskantor in Leipzig, as part of his first cantata cycle. For the Sundays after Trinity of 1724, around a year after he had moved to Leipzig, Bach started his second cantata cycle. The cantatas of this cycle, the chorale cantata cycle, are each based on a Lutheran hymn and its chorale setting. O Ewigkeit, du Donnerwort, BWV 20, a chorale cantata from Bach's second cycle, was first presented in June 1724 and has a funereal theme comparable to that of a Trinity XVI cantata. BWV 8, a meditation on a Christian's death, approaches the death theme differently from Bach's earlier Trinity XVI and BWV 10 cantatas: anxious questions about the hour of death dominate the first half of the BWV 8 cantata, while in its later movements such sorrows are dismissed with references to Christ and God's standfastness.

Compared to the over 50 other chorale cantatas composed by Bach, most of which are based on hymns and chorale melodies that were at least half a century old when Bach adopted them, the BWV 8 cantata is based on relatively recent material, that is, by an author and a composer who lived into the 18th century.

=== Hymn and melody ===
Liebster Gott, wenn werd ich sterben, BWV 8, is one of Bach's church cantatas for the 16th Sunday after Trinity (Trinity XVI). The prescribed readings for the Sunday were from the Epistle to the Ephesians, praying for the strengthening of faith in the congregation of Ephesus (Ephesians 3:13–21), and from the Gospel of Luke, the raising from the dead of the young man from Nain (Luke 7:11–17).

Caspar Neumann, a professor of Protestant theology and pastor from Breslau, wrote "Liebster Gott, wann werd ich sterben", a hymn in five stanzas of eight lines, around 1690.

Daniel Vetter, a native of Breslau, set Neumann's hymn in the first half of the 1690s. In 1695, this setting of the hymn was sung at the funeral of cantor Jakob Wilisius in Breslau. In 1713, Vetter published a SATB setting of his hymn tune, Zahn No. 6634, as the concluding piece, Nos 91–92, of the second volume of his Musicalische Kirch- und Hauß-Ergötzlichkeit (lit. 'Musical Refreshment for Church and Home'). The two volumes of that publication, totalling 221 four-part settings of Lutheran chorale melodies, were first printed in Leipzig. Aimed at the pious Leipzig merchant class for "spiritual recreation" or "refreshment" through music, the simple four-part organ chorales were paired with spinet or clavichord broken-chord variations, in the style brisé, then in vogue. Like Bach's Orgelbüchlein composed during the same period, Vetter's collection starts with Nun komm der Heiden Heiland. It has one piece per page, except for the final chorale Liebster Gott of the 1713 volume which is annotated on two full pages with four separate staves for cantus, alto, tenor and figured bass:

From Kirsten Beißwenger's 1992 dissertation on Bach's personal Library, Bachs Notenbibliothek (BNB), it is surmised that the Bach family owned a copy of the second volume of Vetter's Musicalische Kirch- und Haus-Ergötzlichkeit.

Vetter became organist at St. Nicholas Church in Leipzig in 1679, after succeeding his teacher Werner Fabricius. Vetter's and Bach's paths crossed in 1717: since 1710, Vetter had been supervising the remodelling by Johann Scheibe of the organ of St. Paul's Church in Leipzig; and in December 1717, in a famous report, Bach examined and evaluated the rebuilt instrument with a discussion of Vetter's and his reimbursement. In January 1718, Vetter referred to Bach's appraisal of Scheibe's organ. Vetter died in Leipzig in 1721.

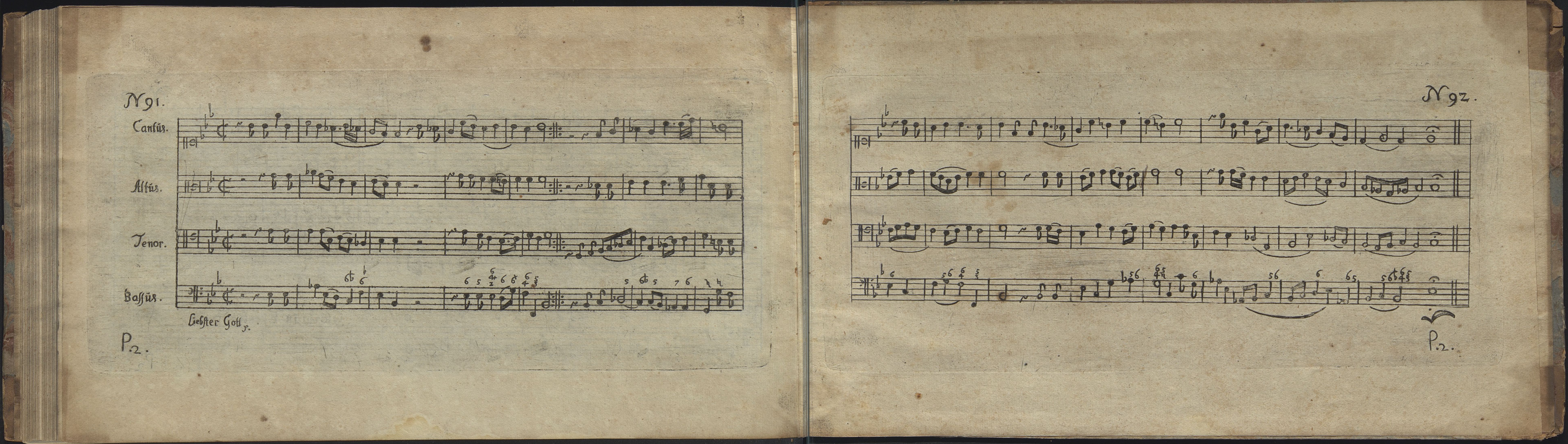
Vetter's chorale "Liebster Gott", as published in 1713

=== BWV 8.1 in E major ===
BWV 8.1, the first version of Bach's chorale cantata Liebster Gott, wenn werd ich sterben, was first performed in St. Nicholas Church on 24 September 1724. The sermon was preached by Salomon Deyling. A volume of Texte zur Leipziger Kirchen-Music (lit. 'Texts for Church Music in Leipzig') containing the librettos of all five chorale cantatas which Bach first performed in September 1724 is extant. The volume was printed by Immanuel Tietze, likely by the time the first of these five cantatas was performed:

1. Allein zu dir, Herr Jesu Christ, BWV 33, for Trinity XIII, first performed on Sunday 3 September 1724.
2. Jesu, der du meine Seele, BWV 78, for Trinity XIV, first performed on Sunday 10 September 1724.
3. Was Gott tut, das ist wohlgetan, BWV 99, for Trinity XV, first performed on Sunday 17 September 1724.
4. Liebster Gott, wenn werd ich sterben, BWV 8.1, for Trinity XVI, first performed on Sunday 24 September 1724.
5. Herr Gott, dich loben alle wir, BWV 130.1, for St. Michael's Day, first performed on Friday 29 September 1724.

The Trinity XVI cantata of Bach's third cantata cycle, Wer weiß, wie nahe mir mein Ende? BWV 27, was first performed on 6 October 1726. BWV 8.1, in E major, was revived in the 1730s, with changes to the type of flute.

=== BWV 8.2 in D major ===
Bach revived the cantata in the late 1740s, with the key transposed down a whole tone from E major to D major. This version of the cantata, BWV 8.2, is also extant, and was likely first performed in September 1747. Some changes to the instrumentation were also implemented: for example, in the first movement the two oboe d'amore parts are given to concertante violins, and in the bass aria, an oboe d'amore plays colla parte with the first violins.

== Music and text ==
=== Text and translations ===
The first and last verses of Neumann's hymn correspond to the first and final movements of the cantata, both of them choral movements. The middle four movements were written by an anonymous librettist, but conformed fairly closely to the spirit of Neumann's other three verses.

Novello published John Troutbeck's translation in the 1870s. A translation by J. Michael Diack was published by Breitkopf & Härtel in 1931. Jean Lunn's translation was published in 1981. In 2020, Z. Philip Ambrose published a revised edition of his 1980s translation of the cantata's text. Melvin P. Unger published an interlinear translation of the cantata in 1996. Richard D. P. Jones's 2005 translation of Alfred Dürr's 1992 book on Bach's cantatas contains a translation of the cantata's libretto. Pamela Dellal's translation of the libretto can be found on the Emmanuel Music website.

=== Scoring ===
BWV 8.1 is scored for:

- SATB soloists and choir
- horn
- flute (fl): originally flauto piccolo, a high pitched recorder, later replaced by a transverse flute
- two oboes d'amore (oba)
- strings (str): two violin parts and one viola part
- basso continuo (bc)

For BWV 8.2:

- same vocal forces as BWV 8.1
- taille
- traverso (fl)
- 2 oba
- str as in BWV 8.1, with additionally two solo violins (vl)
- bc

=== Movements ===
The cantata is in six movements:

Movements of Liebster Gott, wenn werd ich sterben, BWV 8
#	Incipit	Text	Type	Time	BWV 8.1		BWV 8.2	
#	Incipit	Text	Type	Time	Key	Scoring	Key	Scoring
1	Liebster Gott, wenn werd ich sterben?	Neumann	Chorus	12/8	E	tutti	D	tutti
2	Was willst du dich, mein Geist, entsetzen	after Neumann	Aria	3/4	c♯	T, oba, bc	b	T, vl, bc
3	Zwar fühlt mein schwaches Herz	after Neumann	Recitative	common time	g♯–A	A, str, bc	f♯–G	A, str, bc
4	Doch weichet, ihr tollen, vergeblichen Sorgen!	after Neumann	Aria	12/8	A	B, fl, str, bc	G	B, fl, oba, str, bc
5	Behalte nur, o Welt, das Meine!	after Neumann	Recitative	common time	f♯–g♯	S, bc	e–f♯	S, bc
6	Herrscher über Tod und Leben	Neumann	Chorale	common time	E	tutti	D	tutti

==== 1 ====
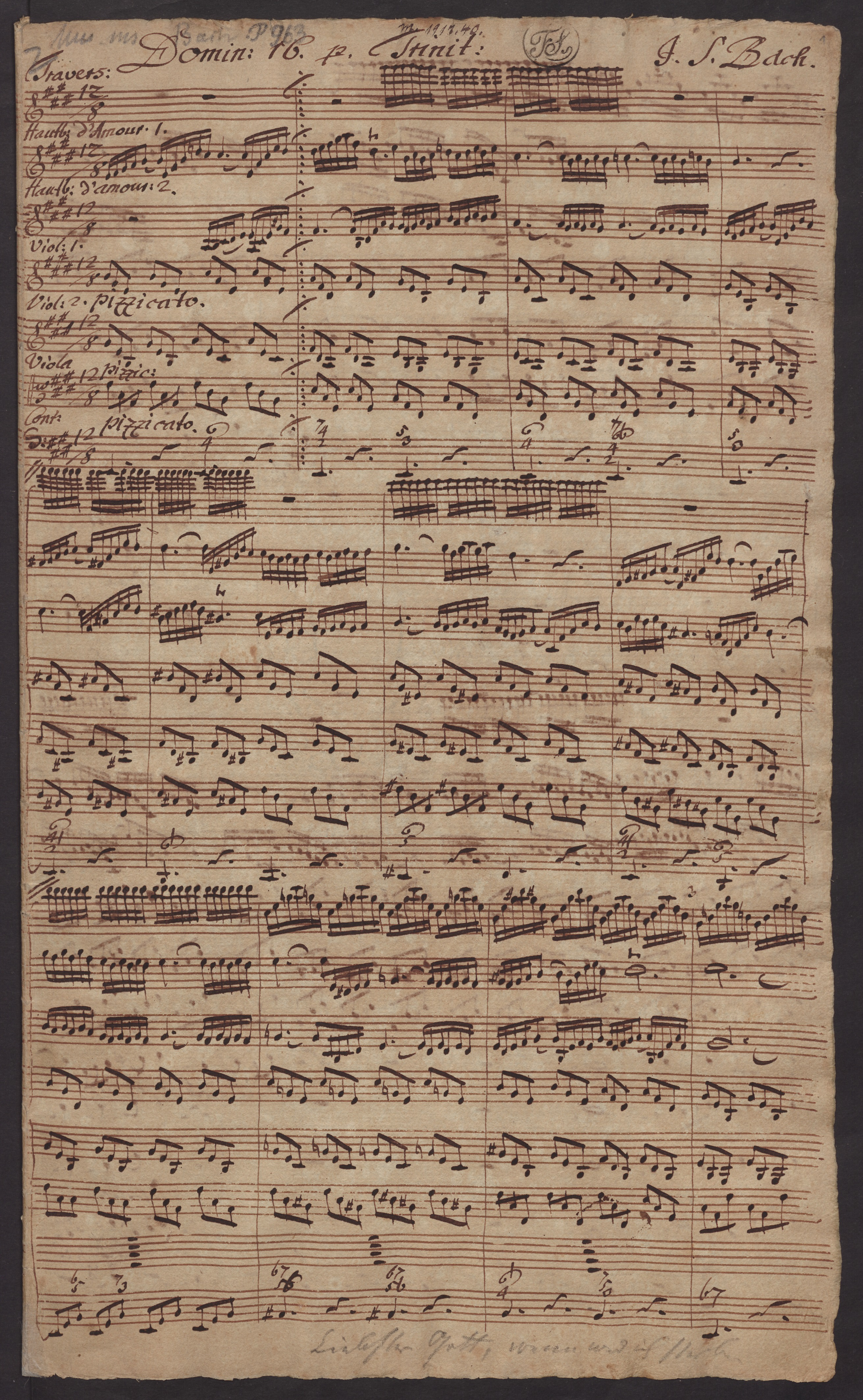
Opening movement of BWV 8, copyist C. F. Barth, c. 1755

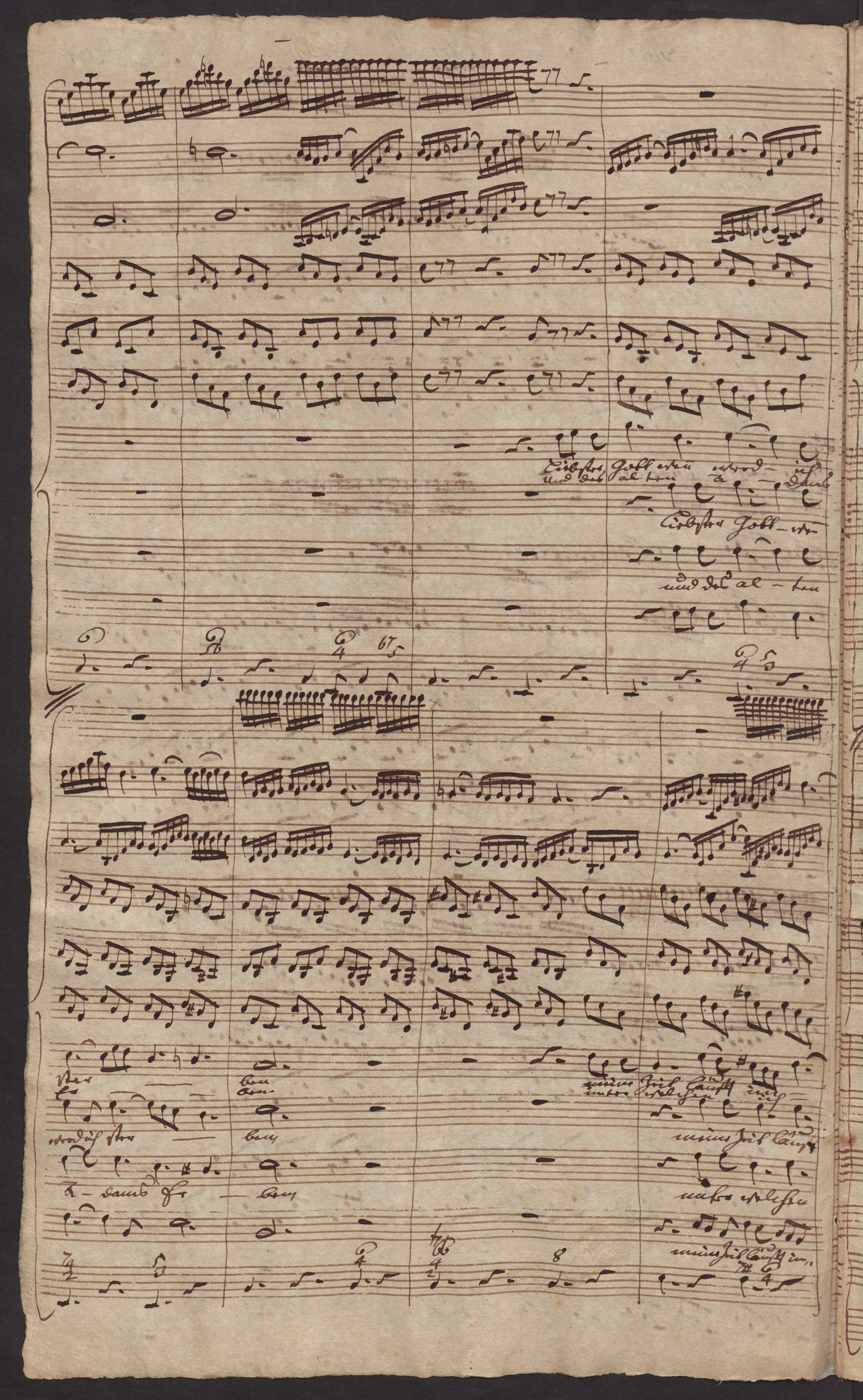
Second page of opening movement of BWV 8: first line and start of second line of vocal chorale

The opening chorale fantasia sets the first stanza of Neumann's hymn. The opening chorus is a gapped chorale setting of Vetter's melody. The alto, tenor, and bass voices sing free counterpoint, while the sopranos sing the chorale unadorned. Spitta described the sound of this movement as a "church-yard full of flowers in the springtime". As Dürr comments, the chorus, with instrumental ensemble of high obbligato flute, two oboes d'amore and downward plucked arpeggios, presents "a sublime vision of the hour of death".

Schering (1932) deems the opening movement of BWV 8 to be "one of the most arresting tone-pictures ever penned by Bach." Although in principle it could be described as a "choral movement", the two or two and a half bar choral passages are so brief and separated by themselves from the extensive instrumental music of the ritornellos, that "they recede as it were into the shadows". The primarily orchestral movement conjures up a poetic image of death, with a mood of prayerful contemplation by the Christian soul. This human spirit is captured without words by the two expressive oboes d'amore. As Schering writes: "Their constant sweet-sounding strains overflow in tenderly articulate, or light and gracefully swelling, figures, which, treated in dialogue form, constitute a stream of almost ceaseless melody". The mournful mood is reflected by the choice of E major as key signature. Schering then explains further poetic ideas involving the movement: metaphysical questions concerning fate, mortality and the hereafter. He describes the old church in Leipzig, with its five bells, the highest and most piercing of which was the death-knell. The staccato repetitive semiquavers of the transverse flute, played at the top of its register, portray pealing bells in Bach's musical iconography—unexpected and unsettling sounds for the listeners. The musical imagery for death is completed by hushed pizzicato triplet quavers in the strings accompanied by solemn beats in the basso continuo. Schering explains how Bach uses all possible musical resources in depicting the troubled soul: "interrupted cadences, chromaticism and diminished sevenths." With a careful balance between choir and delicately scored orchestra, "the whole movement will produce an extraordinarily powerful effect."

Whittaker (1978) compares BWV 8 with the cantata O Ewigkeit, du Donnerwort, BWV 20, a chorale cantata Bach had composed slightly earlier, in June 1724. He notes that, although both cantatas have a similar funereal theme, the two have a quite different spirit. BWV 20 has biblical references to the Raising of Lazarus, and its tortured mood resonates with boiling cauldrons, devils and hell-fire as depicted in Early Netherlandish morality paintings by Hieronymous Bosch and his contemporaries. In contrast, the biblical references for BWV 8 are to the Raising of the son of the widow of Nain; instead of instilling fear, it presents a vision where a penitential sinner, despite their unworthiness, can be saved by God's mercy and be rewarded in heaven. Whittaker finds it unusual that Bach has produced two such differing approaches to death, as disparate as those of Berlioz and Franck.

Having taken note of underlying biblical references, Whittaker explains the highly original musical conception for the first movement: "It is virtually a duet for two oboes d'amore, tender and mournful, an example of 'endless melody' long before Wagner coined the term." With about 70 bars in the movement, the mournful elegy seems "oblivious of space and time." The upper strings are accompanied by arpeggio triplet quaver motifs, only interrupted four times. The continuo only plays on the first and third of each beat throughout the movement, creating an unearthly quality. The obbligato transverse flute solo, playing at its highest register, is unique: the semiquavers repeated 24 times represent the quavering soul; while the arpeggiated semiquavers depict pealing bells. According to Whittaker, because the original chorale was not developed in any way, the movement should strictly be regarded as an extended chorale instead of a chorale fantasia. The cantus firmus of the chorale is quite different from those Bach normally used, more florid with more changes of note-lengths. It is not suitable for use as augmentation, Bach's habitual way of employing way the melody. It is sung one beat per note accompanied by the horn, sometimes with ornamentation; only once does the cantus firmus play for more than 3 bars; and except for once, when it is joined by the tenor, it starts alone on the upbeat. Although Whittaker comments on the changes to scoring for the different versions (with solo violins replacing the oboes d'amore, possibly because of technical breathing difficulties), he concludes: "it is wholly unlike any other expansion of a chorale. One may think of it as a solemn funeral which is watched by someone who is himself about to depart, and who, from time to time, breathes to himself this hymn."

After outlining the technical difficulties involving performances of BWV 8 for the virtuosic obbligato flute solo passages in the opening movement, Anderson (2003) finds that the later version in D major might be easier to execute but loses the "iridescent tonal palette" of E major, the original key. Anderson writes of the first movement of the cantata: "The transcendentally beautiful opening chorus of Liebster Gott must rank among Bach's most poetic and alluring fantasias." Although Bach composed profoundly moving cantatas evoking the death-knell before hand (BWV 161, BWV 73, BWV 95) and afterwards (BWV 127, BWV 198), the first movement of BWV 8 is unique in the imaginative and tender way it summons up the haunting atmosphere of chiming death-knells. Two melodious oboes d'amore, the high-pitched transverse flute and pizzicato strings provide the extensive orchestral passages which are interspersed with each short vocal line of Vetter's chorale. The soprano cantus firmus is sung colla parte with the horn. When all these components are combined, Bach's music evokes a "melancholy but affirmative, and in no sense desolate, picture."

Liebster Gott, wenn werd ich sterben?
Meine Zeit läuft immer hin,
Und des alten Adams Erben,
Unter denen ich auch bin,
Haben dies zum Vaterteil,
Dass sie eine kleine Weil
Arm und elend sein auf Erden
Und denn selber Erde werden.

— Caspar Neumann
Translation:

When will God recall my spirit?
Lives of men run swiftly by;
All who Adam's frame inherit,
One among his heirs am I,
Know that this befalls the race,
They but for a little space
Dwell on earth in want and mourning,
Soon to earth themselves returning.

— translated by John Troutbeck

==== 2 ====
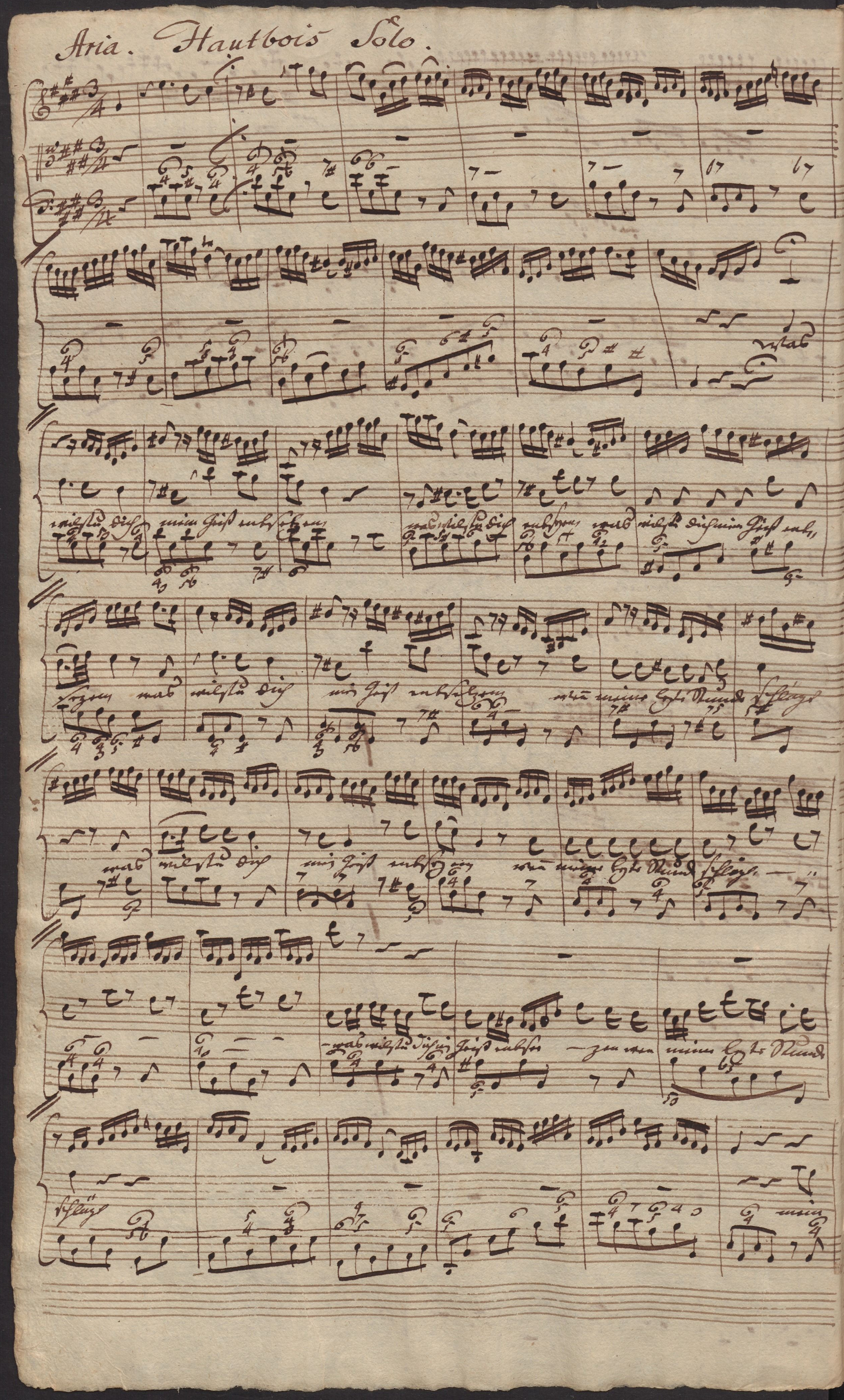
Aria for tenor and oboe d'amore: manuscript copied by C. F. Barth, c. 1755

The second movement in C sharp minor is a tenor aria, characterized by continued tones of the death knell in the pizzicato accompaniment of the continuo. The instrumental and vocal lines, with its detached quavers, ornamentation and imitative entries, are an eloquent duet between the oboe d'amore and the tenor. For Schering (1932), the aria is a model of Bach's high regard for the text. Dealing again with Christian faith and human fear of death, the theme is now of terror: the musical motifs are angular and the mood anguished.

Whittaker (1978) gives a detailed description of the musical structure of the tenor aria (not a da capo aria). In contrast to the first movement, where the chorus comment watchfully, the text and mood are more empassioned. The aria begins with a ritornello—an expressive oboe d'amore solo accompanied by detached pizzicato quavers for the continuo, representing the solemn funeral bells. The 1727 aria Erbarme dich, mein Gott ("Have mercy my God") for alto and violin from the St Matthew Passion is identical melodically, although the phrasing is slightly different. This musical motif is one that Bach often associates with "pity". The ritornello continues with a lengthy passage for semiquavers, where musical iconography again comes into play. As the tenor takes over the instrumental material, the oboe d'amore accompanies imitatively. The tenor is later heard with emphatic detached staccato crotchets as he sings schlägt ("strikes"), for the clock striking on the hour; and later still the oboe d'amore semiquavers are heard in parallel thirds with the tenor's soaring tausend ("thousand"). The extended second section begins with the words Mein Leib ("my body"): here the inversion of melody is heard twice with further parallel renditions of "thousand"; and long sustained notes for Ruh ("rest") accompany a restatement of the oboe d'amore melody. The second section concludes with the instrumental ritornello.

Was willst du dich, mein Geist, entsetzen,
Wenn meine letzte Stunde schlägt?
Mein Leib neigt täglich sich zur Erden,
Und da muss seine Ruhstatt werden,
Wohin man soviel tausend trägt.

— after Caspar Neumann
Translation:

And why art thou, my soul, so fearful
Expecting life's last hour so sound?
My frame is daily earthward making.
Repose therein I would be taking
Repose which thousands more have found.

— translated by John Troutbeck

==== 3 ====
The third movement is an alto recitative, where the soloist sings of their fear of death. With a string accompaniment, they sing of their questions of anxiety. Phrygian cadences, with the voice rising, are heard twice: this musical technique was how Bach liked to introduce a questioning tone. Schering (1932) writes: "What mastery in the last four bars alone, forming a questioning close in the Phrygian mode!" As described by Whittaker (1978), the soloist complains of "wordly suffering and loss." This beautiful setting is filled with emotion: the first violin "moves uneasily, as if the soul were trying to raise its load."

Zwar fühlt mein schwaches Herz
Furcht, Sorge, Schmerz:
Wo wird mein Leib die Ruhe finden?
Wer wird die Seele doch
Vom aufgelegten Sündenjoch
Befreien und entbinden?
Das Meine wird zerstreut,
Und wohin werden meine Lieben
In ihrer Traurigkeit
Zertrennt, vertrieben?

— after Caspar Neumann
Translation:

Within my heart I bear
fear, sorrow, care.
Where will my body rest be finding?
And who will from my soul
the weight of life's transgressions roll,
their grievous yoke unbinding?
Possessions have I none,
and for those whom I love, I ponder
(and ask, when I am gone,
where they will wander).

— translated by John Troutbeck

==== 4 ====
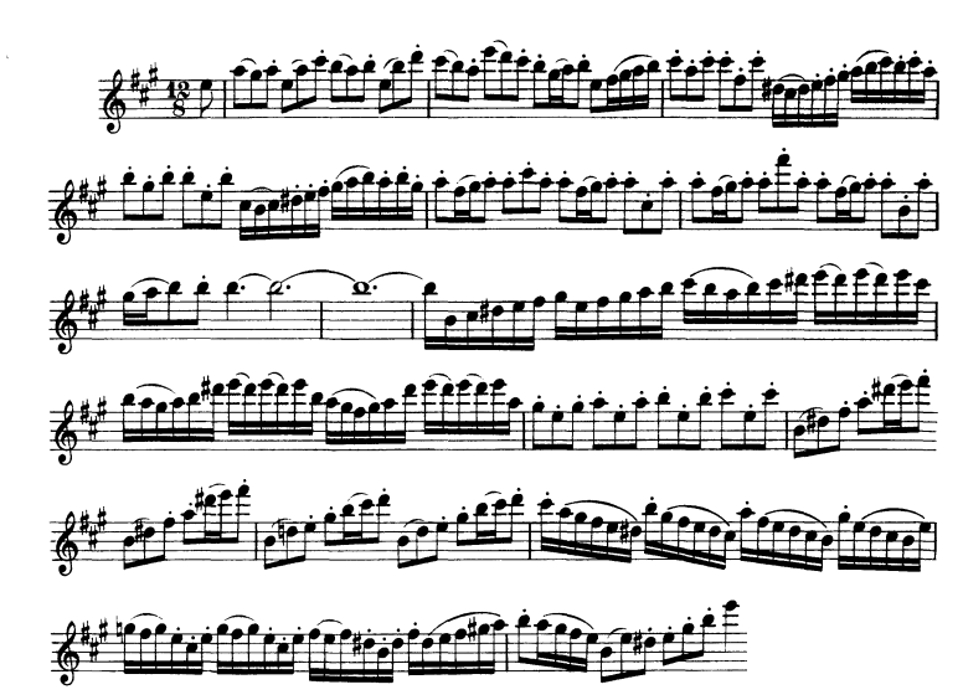
Obbligato transverse flute solo of the ritornello for the bass aria in BWV 8

Contrasting with the preceding recitative, the fourth movement is a joyous bass da capo aria in "jig tempo". There is a complete change of mood: "It is a delightful gigue, a piece of unabashed dance music made to serve the purpose of the church." With all despondency quelled, the obbligato transverse flute starts its rhythmic solo in A major and 12/8 times. In Bach's sacred works, the flute was most often associated with death and mourning; but here it evokes joyous laughter; this kind of virtuosic writing, with brilliant rapid semiquaver passage work and extraordinary leaps, is reminiscent of the Brandenburg Concertos or Orchestral Suites (for example the last movements of the Third, Fifth or Sixth Brandenburg Concerto or the Badinerie from Suite No 2).

Little & Jenne (2001) discuss Bach's gigue from the perspect of baroque dance music. A special kind of 12/8 gigue used by Bach was singled out, the Giga II, his "most complex, exploratory and challenging." They are characterised by their subdivided beats (e.g. triplets), normally with an upbeat; a joyous and intense mood; jigging rhythms; long phrases without break; and a dance-like lilt. Little and Jenne write that these were "the farthest from actual dancing or any choreographic associations at all ... more of an instrumental excursion than any other Baroque dance type except the allemande. It is easy to see why Bach was attracted to it, even though his German contemporaries were not." The bass aria falls into this category.

The 16 bar ritornello for solo flute and strings has several striking characteristics: the "rollicking tune" in the first two bars; the "quirky responses" in quavers and semiquavers in bars three and four; the "leaping passages" which dart up and below in bar five and even more so in bar six; the "sustained note", a 'halo' announced by an ornamental triplet in the flute, while the first violins take up the boisterous tune in bars eight and nine; the "quaver triplet scales" in bar eleven; the "triplet arpeggios" cavorting upwards in bars twelve and thirteen; and three "repeating semiquaver motifs" in bar fifteen that prepare for the final cadence. The other parts of the ritornello involve rapid semiquaver passage work for the flute, often in sequences, as the strings gently accompany either with detached crotchets or long sustained notes.

After the ritornello, the singing of the bass soloist begins with a section of 22 bars. There is an expository section for bass, flute and strings. The bass starts with its romping melody for two bars, accompanied by the 'halo' motif on the flute and a new sighing response in the strings: the flute responds with the last two bars of the ritornello; the bass then sings another two bars of the tune, with the flute and strings swapping their roles. After that bass and flute perform a duet, with the strings playing the samme accompanying role as in the ritornello (detached crotchets or long sustained notes). The new music for the bass singer combines rapid semiquaver runs and turns, detached quavers and long sustained notes; this material is matched to the earlier flute motifs. The flow is broken as the bass asks Mich rufet mein Jesus, wer sollte nicht gehn? in detached phrases, accompanied on the flute by triplet scales and three bars of high-pitched arpeggios. Accompanied only by the continuo, the bass then sings the same question to the tune of the triplet scale and arpeggio figures; without pause the flute and strings play a two and a half bar coda similar to the end of the ritornello.

The music of the next 15 bars is sung to the second part of the text and corresponds to the middle da capo section. The bass here plays a more dominant role, starting off in a dance-like rhythm with several octave leaps. There are initially gently responses from flute and strings. Then, as the bass solo starts to sing the staccato crotchets nichts, the flute commences a motto perpetuo accompaniment with the 'repeating semiquaver motifs' in sequence and sustained strings. With strings playing only detached crotchets, the bass solo begins a new long sequences of semiquaver figures on verkläret in parallel with the flute. With an octave leap, the bass sings a sustained Jesus. As the flute in a flourish takes up its original jig tune in the relative minor accompanied by short sighs in the strings, the bass sings verkläret with an octave leap and a one and a half bar note for the second syllable. With just the continuo, the bass finishes his phrase with herrlich vor Jesu zu stehn.

The da capo section starts off with the 16 bar ritornello for flute and strings repeated without change. The final section lasts 24 bars, thus 22 bars for bass, flute and strings plus a two and a half bar coda for orchestra alone. The first six bars are identical to the corresponding solo bass section. At that point a half bar of two semiquaver scales is introduced in the orchestra, while the key modulates through D major to E major. Otherwise, with some adaptations, flute and strings play as before, but now off beat. For the bass solo almost all of the musical material is unaltered (a few semiquaver motifs become closer to those of the flute). The final solo bass phrase with continuo acquires an additional half bar for the last words wer wollte ich gehn? The movement concludes with a two and a half bar coda for flute and strings ending on an A major cadence.

Doch weichet, ihr tollen, vergeblichen Sorgen!
Mich rufet mein Jesus, wer sollte nicht gehn?
Nichts, was mir gefällt,
Besitzet die Welt.
Erscheine mir, seliger, fröhlicher Morgen,
Verkläret und herrlich vor Jesu zu stehn.

— after Caspar Neumann
Translation:

Yet silence, for thoughtless and vain is my sorrow,
He calls me, my Saviour, and who would not go?
Nought would I receive
which this world can give.
Appear then o blessed and lifegiving morrow
In glory unclouded my Lord I will know.

— translated by John Troutbeck

==== 5 ====
The fifth movement is a short secco recitative for soprano and continuo. The confident mood of the bass aria is maintained in the soprano line. Whittaker (1978) paraphrases the last sentence of the text Und kann nicht sterben as 'and cannot die.' He notes that: "In spite of the happiness of the mood, Bach cannot resist falsifying the meaning of the sentence by painting 'die' with a melisma involving a diminished third."

Behalte nur, o Welt, das Meine!
Du nimmst ja selbst mein Fleisch und mein Gebeine;
So nimm auch meine Armut hin;
Genug, dass mir aus Gottes Überfluss
Das höchste Gut noch werden muss;
Genug, dass ich dort reich und selig bin.
Was aber ist von mir zu erben
Als meines Gottes Vatertreu?
Die wird ja alle Morgen neu
Und kann nicht sterben.

— after Caspar Neumann
Translation:

Whate'er I have, o world, then take thou!
My very flesh and bones thine own now make thou;
Take poverty among the rest.
Enough, that out of God's unbounded store
The highest good on me will pour;
Enough, that I am with heavenly wealth am blessed.
Of mine what gift is there to cherish,
Except the truth that God is true?
But that is ev'ry morning new,
and can not perish.

— translated by John Troutbeck

==== 6 ====
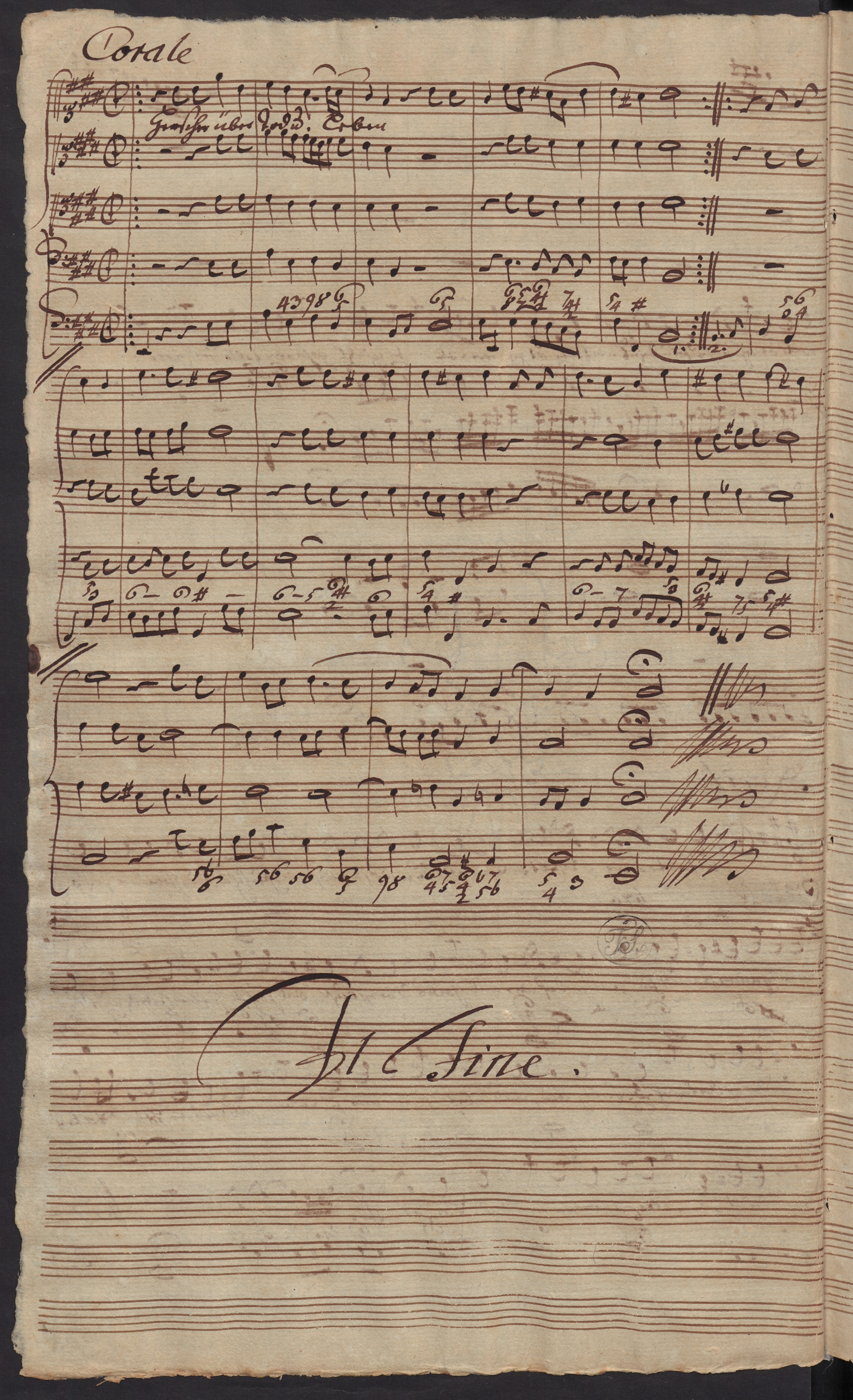
Closing chorale of BWV 8, copyist C. F. Barth, c. 1755

The chorus and orchestra unite in the final chorale. Wolff notes that "the texturally transparent and rhythmically vibrant setting" of the closing chorale is informed by the treatment of the opening chorus. Emil Platen and Christoph Wolff have observed that when Bach adapted or borrowed chorales from more recent composers such as Vopelius or Vetter, he composed in a more fashionable and melodic style. According to the concluding sentence of Dürr & Jones (2006), there is a "brief secco recitative, after which all participants unite in the concluding chorale—borrowed from Daniel Vetter, albeit with radical alterations." According to Whittaker (1978), Bach's musical treatment of the closing chorale, closely modelled on Vetter's original from 1713, is "modernistic" and closer to songs from the Schemellis Gesangbuch. Mostly the soprano voice leads with an upbeat, followed by the lower voices; and, for the concluding "Schanden" ("shame"), the harmony is forlorn. Whittaker writes: "the basses have a splendid phrase sinking from upper C to low E. The flute is instructed to double the melody ottava." Arnold Schering summarises the last movement as follows: "After the mood thus established has been re-asserted by the soprano in a Recitative, there follows the final Chorale—this time arranged on a plan unusual with Bach. The crotchets of each line are separated into upbeat quavers, and in one or two voices are made to precede the others. Hence a certain liveliness is achieved, a happy counterpart to the spirit of joy attained in the bass aria." As Anderson (2003) comments, a single crotchet bass note and a key change from A major to E major signal the beginning of the final chorale: contrary to Bach's usual method of composition, he did not produce an original harmonisation but adopted Vetter's as "a gesture of appreciation towards a predecessor whom Bach must have respected."

Herrscher über Tod und Leben,
Mach einmal mein Ende gut,
Lehre mich den Geist aufgeben
Mit recht wohlgefasstem Mut!
Hilf, dass ich ein ehrlich Grab
Neben frommen Christen hab
Und auch endlich in der Erde
Nimmermehr zuschanden werde!

— Caspar Neumann
Translation:

Thou that life and death ordainest,
Make it mine in peace to die;
Let me yield the soul Thou trainest,
With a courage calm and high.
Grant that I an honoured grave
With the holy dead may have,
Earthly grief and toil forsaking,
Nevermore to shame awaking.

— translated by John Troutbeck

== Manuscripts and scores ==
=== Autograph manuscripts and copyists ===
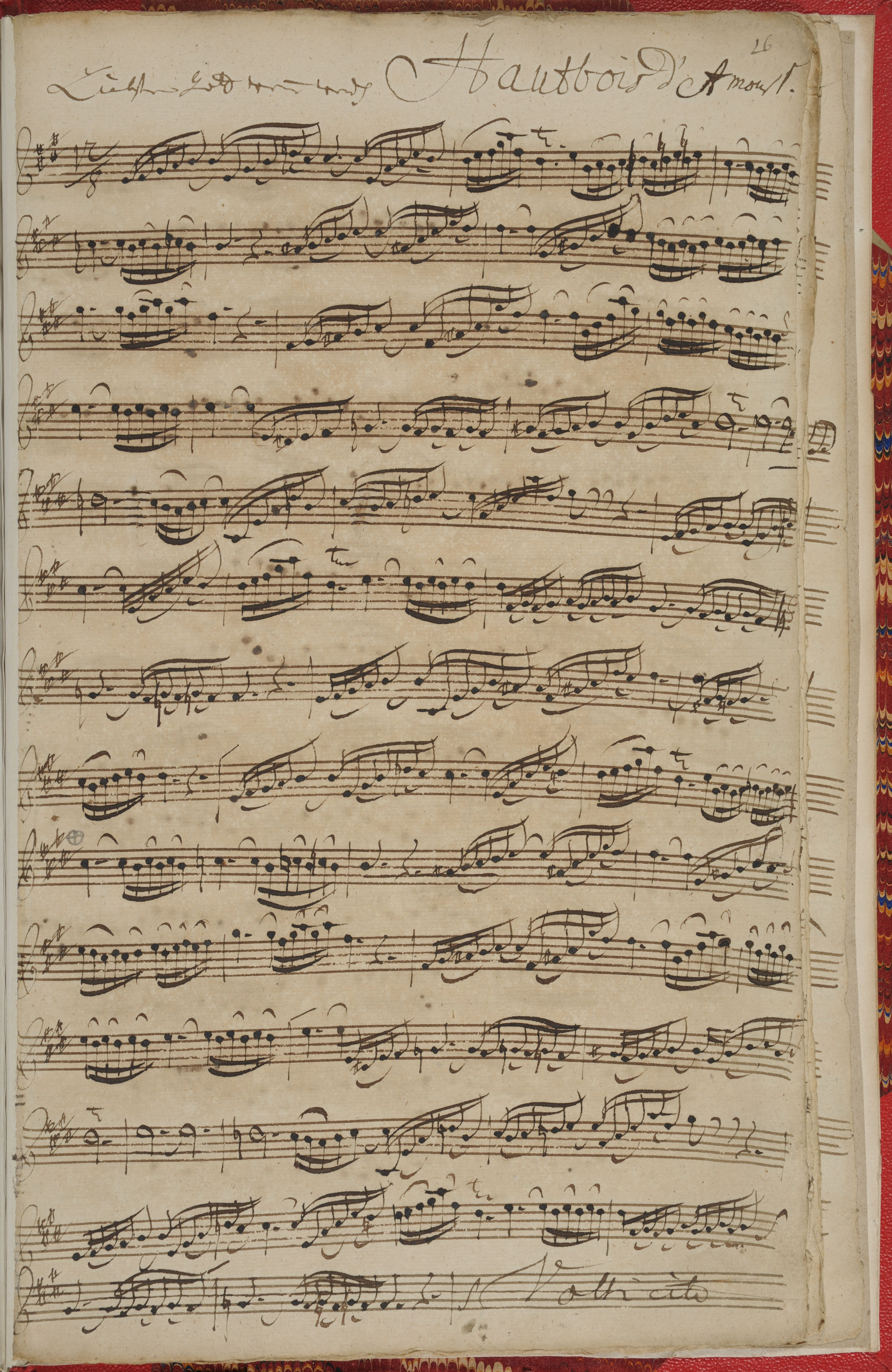
Obbligato solo in the first oboe d'amore part at the beginning of J. S. Bach's cantata. Autograph manuscript, 1724

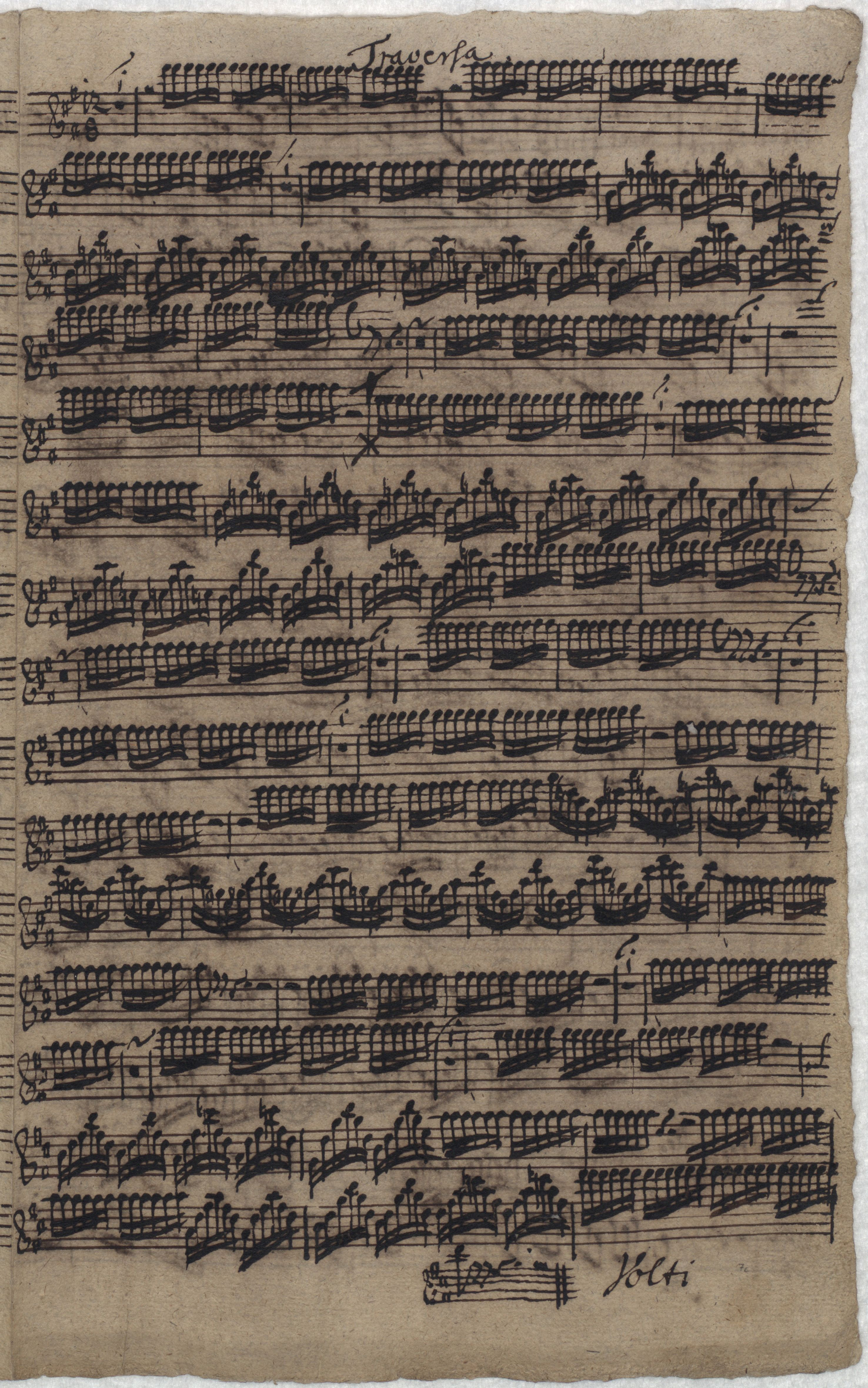
Obbligatio solo traverso part for opening movement of J. S. Bach's cantata, D major version. Autograph manuscript, 1747

Although first performed in 1724, Bach's original manuscript for the vocal and orchestral parts of BWV 8.1 did not remain in the archives of the St. Thomas Church: around 150 years later, the autograph manuscripts were acquired by the Royal Library of Belgium in Brussels. In fact, after Bach's death, the music publishing company of Johann Gottlob Immanuel Breitkopf, at the 1761 Michaelmas Fair in Leipzig, started to advertise their own catalogue of hand-copied and printed versions of sacred cantatas, at that stage uniquely for feast days. Apart from the two churches where Bach previously had duties, the St. Thomas Church and the St. Nicholas Church, the only church where concerts were regularly held was the Neukirche. With a second Breitkopf catalogue for 1770, interest in church music was even more in decline during the second half of the eighteenth century, possibly as a result of changing fashions, with demands for more performable and simpler repertoire. Breitkopf expressed regret that amateur musicians "are not used to playing from engraved and printing editions, but often prefer to play from more expensive handwritten copies." With his company failing, in 1796 Breitkopf sold his business concerns to Gottfried Christoph Härtel.

Although the history of how Bach's autograph parts were transmitted to Brussels has become well known, the role as copyists of schoolboys at the Thomasschule has been harder to establish. Recently Maul (2018) has devoted a book to the topic. In 2003 Michael Maul and Peter Wollny settled a mystery about a previously unidentified copyist for BWV 8. He had been described by Göttingen musicologists Dürr and Kobayashi as the "Doles copyist" (Schreiber der Doles-Partituren), because of the association with C.F. Doles, Thomaskantor from 1756 until 1789. Maul & Wollny (2003) discovered that the copyist was Carl Friedrich Barth, born in 1734, the son of a merchant from Glauchau. Barth became a chorister at the Thomasschule in 1746, where he was picked out by Bach for his skills in Latin to become music prefect. After leading performances at the Thomaskirche and Nikolaikirche, he enrolled at the University of Leipzig in 1757 to study philosophy and theology. In 1770 he was appointed as a Cantor in Borna, where he died in 1813.

Although in 1803 Härtel stated that the Bach family had already received a large sum for purchasing Bach's inherited manuscripts, the statement required some degree of qualification. The rebranded company of Breitkopf & Härtel advertised its 1810 "Catalogue of Church Music that can be obtained in accurate and clean copies." Amongst the Bach cantatas listed were BWV 8 as well as Widerstehe doch der Sünde, BWV 54, BWV 80, BWV 97, BWV 117, BWV 118 and BWV 131. Härtel died in 1827, sending the publishing firm once more into financial disarray with "grim years under shakey management." This instability led to a great auction on 1 June 1836 to alleviate matters. Original manuscripts were offered to the "highest bidders"; although a few large libraries acquired copies, it is still possible that some manuscripts remain undiscovered elsewhere. At that auction the score of BWV 54, in the hand of Johann Gottfried Walther, and the autograph manuscript parts of BWV 8 were purchased by François-Joseph Fétis, the Belgian musicologist. Following Fétis' death in 1871, BWV 8 and BWV 54 were acquired in 1872 by the Bibliothèque Royale Albert 1er in Brussels.

Carl Friedrich Barth, who had become a pupil of the St. Thomas School in Leipzig in 1746, was a copyist who worked for Bach and his successors Gottlob Harrer and Johann Friedrich Doles. In the period between Harrer's demise (9 July 1755) and the start of Doles's tenure (January 1756) he was, together with Christian Friedrich Penzel, acting Thomascantor. Around this period of Barth and Penzel's interim cantorate, Barth copied a number of cantatas by Bach: among these copies is an extant score of the E major version of BWV 8. Doles revived the D major version of the cantata after 1756.

Original performance parts of the D major version of the cantata survive. These manuscripts, partially in Bach's handwriting, remained in Leipzig after the composer's death, where they are conserved by the Bach Archive since the second half of the 20th century.

=== Chronology ===
Spitta thought, based on his research, that both the E major and D major versions of the cantata were composed in 1723 or 1724. In 1957, Dürr published his research which found that the E major version was first performed of on 24 September 1724, and the D major version on a later date. Yoshitake Kobayahshi determined the chronology for Bach's late compositions and performances, including the revival of BWV 8 in its D major version. These researchers relied on scientific methods such as use of watermarks and handwriting, as well as working out possible copyists from that period.

=== Score editions ===
The cantata was first published in 1851, when the BG included it as No. 8 in the first volume of their collected edition of Bach's works. The BG score, in E major, mixes elements from the BWV 8.1 and 8.2 versions. The edition was based on two manuscript copies of the E major version, and the original manuscript of the D major performance parts, which, at the time, were archived at the St. Thomas School. A separate edition of both versions followed only in 1982, when they were included separately in the NBE's volume containing Bach's Trinity XVI and XVII cantatas, edited by Helmuth Osthoff and Rufus Hallmark. In 2017, an updated version of Reinhold Kubik's 1981 edition of the BWV 8.1 version, supplemented with a foreword by Hans-Joachim Schulze, was issued in the Stuttgarter Bach-Ausgaben series.

== Closing chorale ==
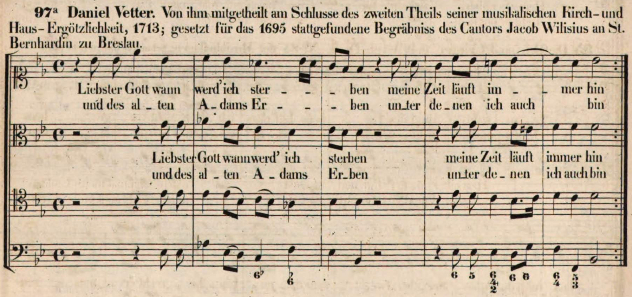
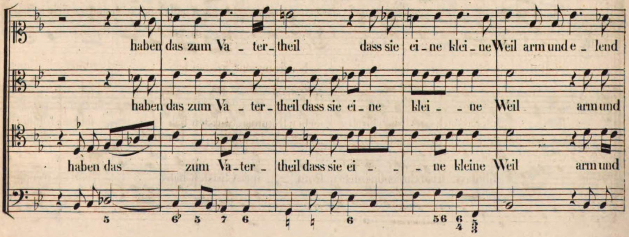
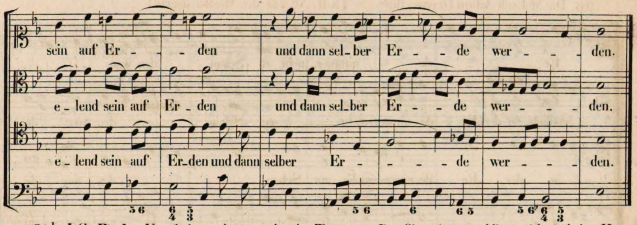
Vetter's four-part setting (1713)
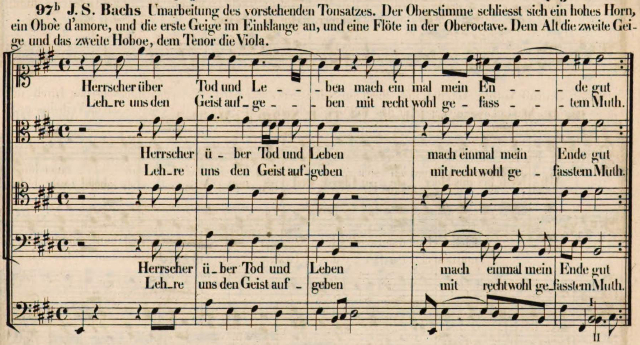
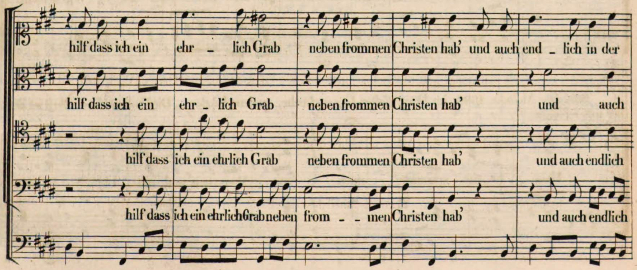
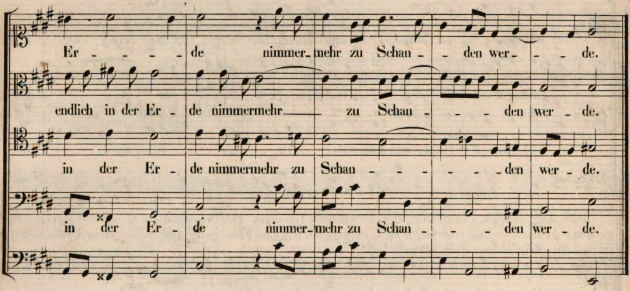
Bach's four-part setting

Bach's son Carl Philipp Emanuel published the vocal parts of the cantata's closing chorale (BWV 8/6) in the Birnstiel and Breitkopf editions of his father's four-part chorales:

- No. 47, p. 24, in Birnstiel's 1765 publication
- No. 43, p. 24, in Breitkopf's 1784 publication

Comparing Vetter's four-part setting of his "Liebster Gott, wann werd ich sterben" melody (1713) to the last movement of Bach's cantata, Winterfeld wrote:

Der Tonsatz Vetters über diese seine Melodie, den wir bereits früher mit Bezug auf einen von Joh. Sebastian Bach mittheilten, (Beispiel 97 a. b.) gewährt gegen diesen gehalten eine anziehende Vergleichung, da er uns zeigt, wie mit wenigen Zügen und anscheinend unerheblichen Veränderungen der gleichzeitige große Meister der löblichen Erfindung seines Kunstgenossen die letzte Vollendung gegeben hat.

— Carl von Winterfeld (1847)
Translation:

Vetter's setting of this melody of his, which we have already communicated earlier in connection with one by J. S. Bach, (example 97a and b) offers a compelling comparison when the former is held against the latter, while it shows us how, with a few touches and seemingly insignificant modifications, the contemporaneous great master gave the ultimate completion to the praiseworthy realisation of his fellow-artist.

— translation

After referring to Vetter's four-part setting, published in 1713, and to Winterfeld's comments about it, Spitta wrote:

Bach hat die vierstimmige Arie gekannt, denn eben dieselbe ist es, welche, wenn auch umgearbeitet, so doch in leicht wieder zu erkennender Gestalt den Schluß seiner Cantate ausmacht. Man sieht wieder, Bach hielt seine Leipziger Kunstvorgänger in Ehren.

— Philipp Spitta (1880)
Translation:

Bach must have known this four-part aria, for it is the same which appears at the end of his cantata, in a somewhat altered form, but easily recognisable. Here again we perceive that Bach held his Leipzig predecessors in due honour.

— Bell/Fuller Maitland translation

Platen mentioned the closing chorale of BWV 8 in an article published in the 1975 edition of the Bach-Jahrbuch, describing the chorale movement as a reworked version of Vetter's 1713 four-part setting. In 1991 and 1996, the musicologist Frieder Rempp published critical commentaries on the closing chorale for the New Bach Edition (NBE). The closing chorale was listed as spurious in the 1998 edition of the Bach-Werke-Verzeichnis, prepared by the Göttingen musicologists Dürr and Kobayashi. The closing chorale is listed as a spurious work in the third Anhang of the 1998 edition of the Bach-Werke-Verzeichnis: it is a reworked version of Vetter's 1713 four-part setting. According to Dürr, translated by Jones, Bach adopted Vetter's four-part chorale setting "with radical alterations". The Bach Digital website does not list the BWV 8/6 chorale among Vetter's compositions.

Vetter's setting of Neumann's hymn is not homophonic: according to Philipp Spitta, "it is not strictly a chorale but a sacred aria".

== Reception ==
=== Eighteenth and nineteenth century ===
Jorgenson (1986), Jorgenson (1996) and Sposato (2018) have written in detail about changes in the musical life of Leipzig both during Bach's lifetime and its aftermath. The difficulties in finding students from the university available to perform as instrumentalists was already a problem while Johann Kuhnau was Thomaskantor, responsible for two main churches, the Nikolaikirche and the Thomaskirche, as well as the Neuekirche. With Bach replacing Kuhnau, arranging church performances became more orderly. Apart from secular concert music in the Café Zimmermann, there were public concerts advertised as "Concerts Spirituels" in the Gewandhaus and the open air. At the end of the eighteenth century, Protestant worship and liturgical music was reformed in Saxony, with hardly any use of Latin in the church. With the turn of the century Germany saw a "Bach renewal", in which Felix Mendelssohn and Robert Schumann were to play an important role. The musicians Franz Hauser and Moritz Hauptmann also became active in this movement. At one stage Hauser asked Mendelssohn whether he might wish to be successor as Thomaskantor; but, with Mendelssohn's prompting and encouragement, it was Hauptmann who assumed that post in 1842, albeit reluctantly. Aided by Hauser, whose personal collection of Bach manuscripts was one of the largest in Germany, Hauptmann, Schumann and his colleagues, Otto Jahn and Carl Becker, started the Bach-Gesellschaft in 1850; and soon after, in 1851, Hauptmann published the first volume of ten cantatas BWV 1–10 with Breitkopf & Härtel. Hauptmann and Hauser became directors of the conservatory in Leipzig and Munich respectively and the pair carried on a long correspondence, which has been documented in German and English. For cantatas, Hauptmann records that, although separate movements might be suitable for public performance, changes in nineteenth-century practices often made it hard to find suitable instrumentalists. Other musicians such as Johann Nepomuk Schelble, who had conducted a performance of BWV 8 in Frankfurt am Main, considered that eighteenth-century recitatives might no longer be suitable for the public, so could be cut. Carl von Winterfeld expressed doubts about whether Bach's larger sacred works "could find a lasting place in a newly united, newly invigorated and strength evangelical church of our day."

According to 19th-century hymnologist Carl von Winterfeld, Bach felt more at ease with hymn tunes from a less distant past, such as Crüger's "Jesu, meine Freude" and "Schmücke dich, o liebe Seele", Drese's "Seelenbräutigam" and Vetter's "Liebster Gott, wann werd ich sterben", than those by earlier generations of composers, when adopting these chorale melodies in his own compositions: the older melodies go against the grain of how music was experienced in his own time.

Moritz Hauptmann, who edited the cantata for the Bach Gesellschaft (BG) edition, reckons that the D major arrangement was made for ease of performance, E major being a more difficult key for wind instruments than D major, and virtuoso parts, such as the instrumental solos in the first movement, are easier to perform by violins than by oboes. According to Philipp Spitta, the D major version "greatly facilitates the labours of the oboe players".

=== Critical appraisal ===
The cantata was praised by, among others, Philipp Spitta, Arnold Schering, William G. Whittaker and Alfred Dürr. Commentators have agreed in their praise for the cantata: According to Spitta, "The melodious and elaborate bass air and the two recitatives fully correspond in beauty to the other pieces"; Schering states that, "The opening movement of the cantata must be ranked as one of the most arresting tone-pictures ever penned by Bach"; Whittaker wrote that, "Few cantatas are so wholly attractive and so individual as this lovely work"; and Dürr, translated by Jones, has written that, "The opening chorus presents the listener with a sublime vision of the hour of death."

The praise does however not extend to the D major arrangement. According to Hauptmann, the arrangement did not benefit the music: for instance, the solo violins, having naturally a less pronounced volume than oboes, have more difficulty to let their melodies be heard in the first movement. Also in Jones's translation of Dürr the D major version of the cantata is qualified as having a "makeshift character". This appears as a footnote in Dürr & Jones (2006): the editor Helmuth Osthoff prepared the D major version of the cantata for the Neue-Bach Ausgabe in 1982, prior to Dürr's German 1971 book on the cantatas.

== Recordings ==
Both E major and D major versions of the cantata have been recorded. The aria of the BWV 8.2 version was recorded by Ton Koopman with Klaus Mertens as bass soloist with the Amsterdam Baroque Orchestra, and the chorus of that version by Koopman's pupil Masaaki Suzuki and the Bach Collegium Japan in addition to the full cantata in E major. The Dutch website Muziekweb lists several recordings of the cantata, also the Bach Cantatas Website:

Recordings of Liebster Gott, wenn werd ich sterben
Title	Conductor / Choir / Orchestra	Soloists	Label	Year
Bach Cantatas Vol. 4 – Sundays after Trinity	Karl Richter Münchener Bach-Chor Münchener Bach-Orchester	Ursula Buckel; Hertha Töpper; Ernst Haefliger; Kieth Engen	Archiv Produktion	1959
J. S. Bach: Das Kantatenwerk • Complete Cantatas • Les Cantates, Folge / Vol. 2	Gustav Leonhardt Choir of King's College, Cambridge Leonhardt-Consort	soloist of the Regensburger Domspatzen; Paul Esswood; Kurt Equiluz; Max van Egmond	Teldec	1971
Die Bach Kantate Vol. 51	Helmuth Rilling Gächinger Kantorei Bach-Collegium Stuttgart	Arleen Augér; Helen Watts; Adalbert Kraus; Philippe Huttenlocher	Hänssler	1979
J. S. Bach: Cantata BWV 8 "Liebster Gott, wenn werd ich sterben"	Joshua Rifkin The Bach Ensemble	Julianne Baird; Allan Fast; Frank Kelley; Jan Opalach	Decca L'Oiseau-Lyre 455 706–2	1988
J.S. Bach: Cantatas Volume II - Trauerode (BWV 198, 156, 8)	Jeffrey Thomas American Bach Soloists	Julianne Baird; Steven Rickards; Jeffrey Thomas; James Weaver	Koch	1992
J.S. Bach: "Mit Fried und Freud" (Cantatas BWV 8, 125, 138)	Philippe Herreweghe Collegium Vocale Gent The Bach Ensemble	Deborah York; Ingeborg Danz; Mark Padmore; Peter Kooy	Harmonia Mundi France	1998
Bach Edition Vol. 12 – Cantatas Vol. 6	Pieter Jan Leusink Holland Boys Choir Netherlands Bach Collegium	Ruth Holton; Sytse Buwalda; Nico van der Meel; Bas Ramselaar	Brilliant Classics	1999
Bach Cantatas Vol. 8	John Eliot Gardiner Monteverdi Choir English Baroque Soloists	Katharine Fuge; Robin Tyson; Mark Padmore; Thomas Guthrie	Soli Deo Gloria	2000
J. S. Bach: Complete Cantatas Vol. 12	Ton Koopman Amsterdam Baroque Orchestra & Choir	Lisa Larsson; Annette Markert; Christoph Prégardien; Klaus Mertens	Antoine Marchand CC72212	2000
J. S. Bach: Cantatas Vol. 24 – Cantatas from Leipzig 1724 (BWV 8, 33, 113)	Masaaki Suzuki Bach Collegium Japan	Yukari Nonoshita; Robin Blaze; Gerd Türk; Peter Kooy	BIS CD1351	2004
