= Penzel =

Penzel may refer to:

- 19022 Penzel, a main-belt asteroid, named after Edgar Penzel (born 1921)
- Christian Friedrich Penzel (1737–1801), a German musician
- Corporal Kirchner (born Michael Penzel in 1957), an American wrestler
