= Carl Barth =

Carl Barth may refer to:

- Carl Georg Barth (1860–1939), Norwegian-American mathematician and mechanical engineer
- Carl Wilhelm Bøckmann Barth (1847–1919), Norwegian military officer and painter
- Carl Friedrich Barth (1734–1813), German musician and music copyist

== See also ==
- Karl Barth (1886–1968), Swiss Protestant theologian
- Karl Heinrich Barth (1847–1922), German pianist and pedagogue
- Karl L. Barth (1924–2020), American Lutheran minister
