= Uns ist ein Kind geboren, BWV 142 =

Christmas cantata with uncertain attribution

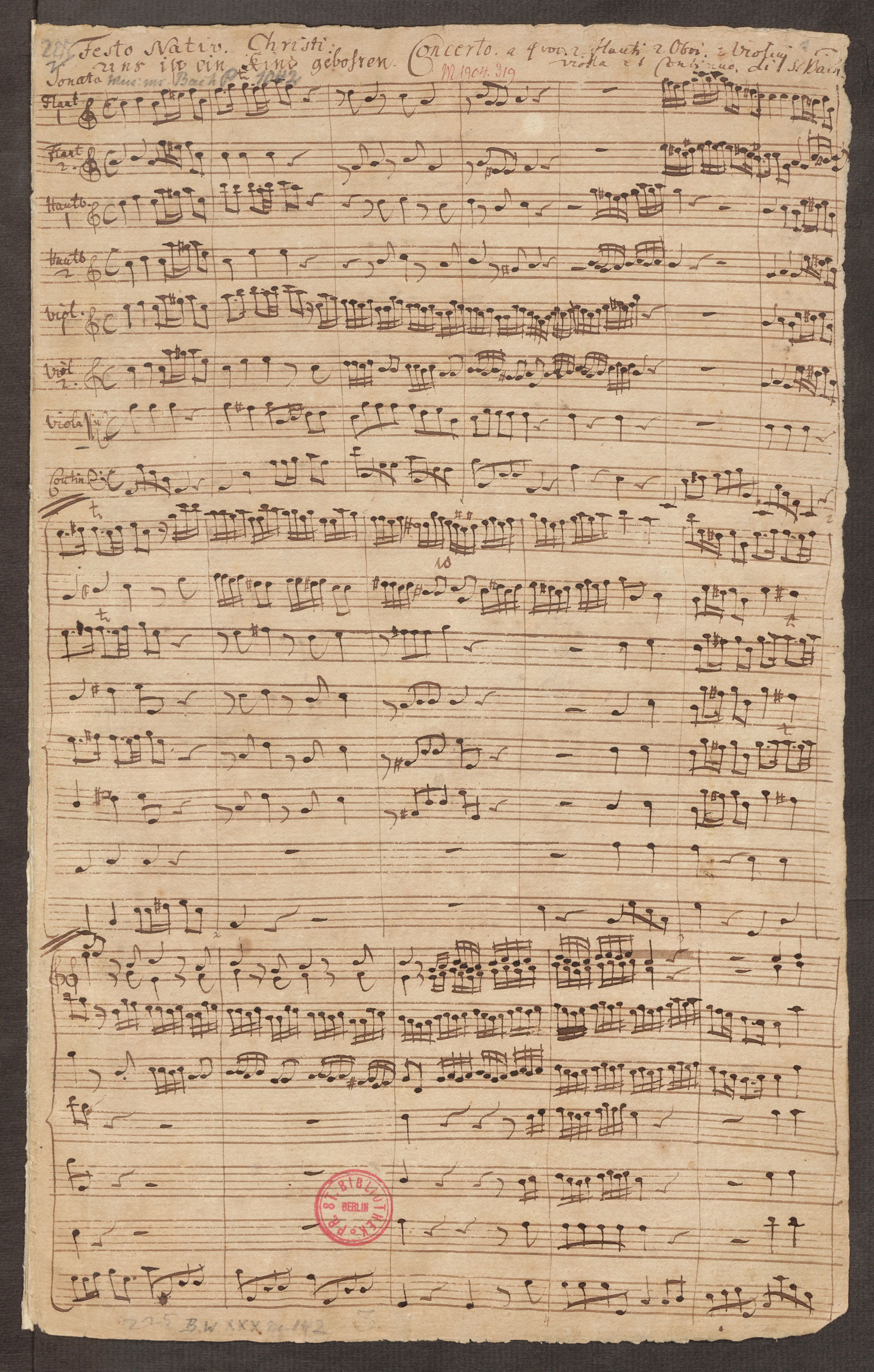
First page of opening sinfonia of Uns ist ein Kind geboren in manuscript copy made in 1756 by C. F. Penzel, who named Bach as composer in the heading

Uns ist ein Kind geboren (Unto us a child is born), BWV 142 / Anh. II 23, is a Christmas cantata by an unknown composer. In the Bach-Werke-Verzeichnis it is listed among the works with a doubtful attribution to Johann Sebastian Bach. The text is based on a libretto by Erdmann Neumeister first published in 1711. Although attributed to Bach by the Bach-Gesellschaft when they first published it in the late nineteenth century, that attribution was questioned within thirty years and is no longer accepted. Johann Kuhnau, Bach's predecessor as Thomaskantor in Leipzig, has been suggested as the probable composer, but without any certainty.

The cantata is in eight movements, and is scored for vocal soloists, choir, recorders, oboes, strings and continuo.

== History, authenticity and attribution ==
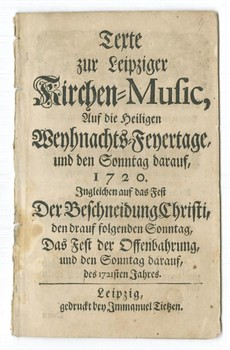
Title page of Leipzig word-book containing text of 1720 Christmas Day cantata

The biblical text, chorale and free verse come from the 1711 collection of librettos of the writer, theologian, pastor and theorist, Erdmann Neumeister. A libretto, based on Neumeister's text, survives in the Stadtgeschichtliches Museum, Leipzig for a cantata with this title. The cantata was listed to be performed in both of the main churches in Leipzig—the Thomaskirche and Nikolaikirche—on Christmas Day 1720, during the period when Johann Kuhnau was Thomaskantor. The earliest surviving manuscript copy of BWV 142 made by Christian Friedrich Penzel in Leipzig on 8 May 1756 is also based on Neumeister's text. Penzel credited J.S. Bach as the author in the heading of the sinfonia on the first page of the manuscript; and he signed the last page, giving the date and place. Differences between the 1720 and 1756 librettos and Neumeister's original text are discussed by Glöckner (2000), but it has not been possible to determine whether the 1756 cantata is a subsequent reworking of the 1720 cantata.

Around the 1830s Franz Xaver Gleichauf made a hand copy of the score of the BWV 142 cantata, without mentioning a composer in his manuscript. In 1843 the Penzel manuscript was copied in Vienna. Another copy of the cantata, made around the same time, was later owned by Johann Theodor Mosewius, who listed Uns ist ein Kind geboren as one of five Christmas cantatas by Bach in an 1845 publication. 19th-century Bach-biographies by Hilgenfeldt (1850), Bitter (1865), Spitta (1873), and Lane Poole (1882) mention Uns ist ein Kind geboren as a cantata composed by Bach.

In 1873, before questions of authenticity had been raised, Philipp Spitta devoted 18 pages of his two-volume biography of Bach to a comparison of Bach and Telemann cantatas that set the same Neumeister text: Spitta's commentary—praising Bach's music while disparaging Telemann's—was typical of musical criticism in the late nineteenth century. Spitta compares the BWV 142 cantata with TVWV 1:1451, a cantata by Telemann on the same libretto by Neumeister: he is fairly dismissive about the Telemann composition ("... probably written in half-an-hour ...", "... shows us the worst side of the church music of the time ..." etc.), only finding a few places where Telemann's composition compares favourably to the composition he attributes to Bach. According to Spitta, Bach "adhered throughout the cantata to the subdued minor key, which offers so singular a contrast to the bright joyfulness of Christmas. It gives a tone as of melancholy reminiscences of the pure Christmas joys of our childhood ...; in contrast to this Telemann's eternal C major is often unutterably shallow and flat."

The cantata was first published as a work of Bach in 1884 by the Bach-Gesellschaft, with Paul Waldersee as editor. After subsequent commentary by Bach scholars Johannes Schreyer, Arnold Schering and Alfred Dürr, that attribution was no longer generally accepted, although the identity of the original composer has not so far been established with certainty. After Schreyer and Schering had cast doubts in 1912–1913 on authorship by Bach, Dürr subjected the cantata in 1977 to the same detailed and rigorous musical analysis as all the other cantatas of Bach. Having established that, if by Bach, the cantata could only have been composed in 1711–1716 during Bach's period in Weimar, Dürr ruled out authorship by Bach based on the presence of uncharacteristic stylistic features (such as the restricted range of the vocal part in the recitative; excessive homophony in the choruses; two obbligato instruments and over-frequent instrumental episodes in the arias, with the solo voice dominating and the instruments consigned to an imitative decorative role), as well as the absence of characteristic elements (such as permutation fugues in choruses; balanced alternation in stile concertato between solo voices and instruments in arias; ostinato-type forms in arias and ritornellos).

According to David Erler, writing in the program notes of a 2015 concert, the cantata has been widely attributed to Kuhnau. Schering had suggested Kuhnau as the possible composer of the cantata in the Bach-Jahrbuch of 1912. Five years later he retracted that suggestion, then thinking it more likely that the cantata was written by one of Kuhnau's students. In the Bach-Werke-Verzeichnis of 1998, the cantata is listed in Anhang II, the annex of doubtful works. According to the critical commentary of the New Bach Edition, written by Andreas Glöckner, possible problems with the attribution to Kuhnau arise from differences between the surviving 1720 Leipzig libretto for Kuhnau's cantata and the text in Penzel's version; with the modernity of the opening sinfonia, which departs from Kuhnau's more conservative style; and from the absence in Penzel's version of trumpets and drums, instruments traditionally used in the two main churches of Leipzig for Christmas Day cantatas.

== Movements ==
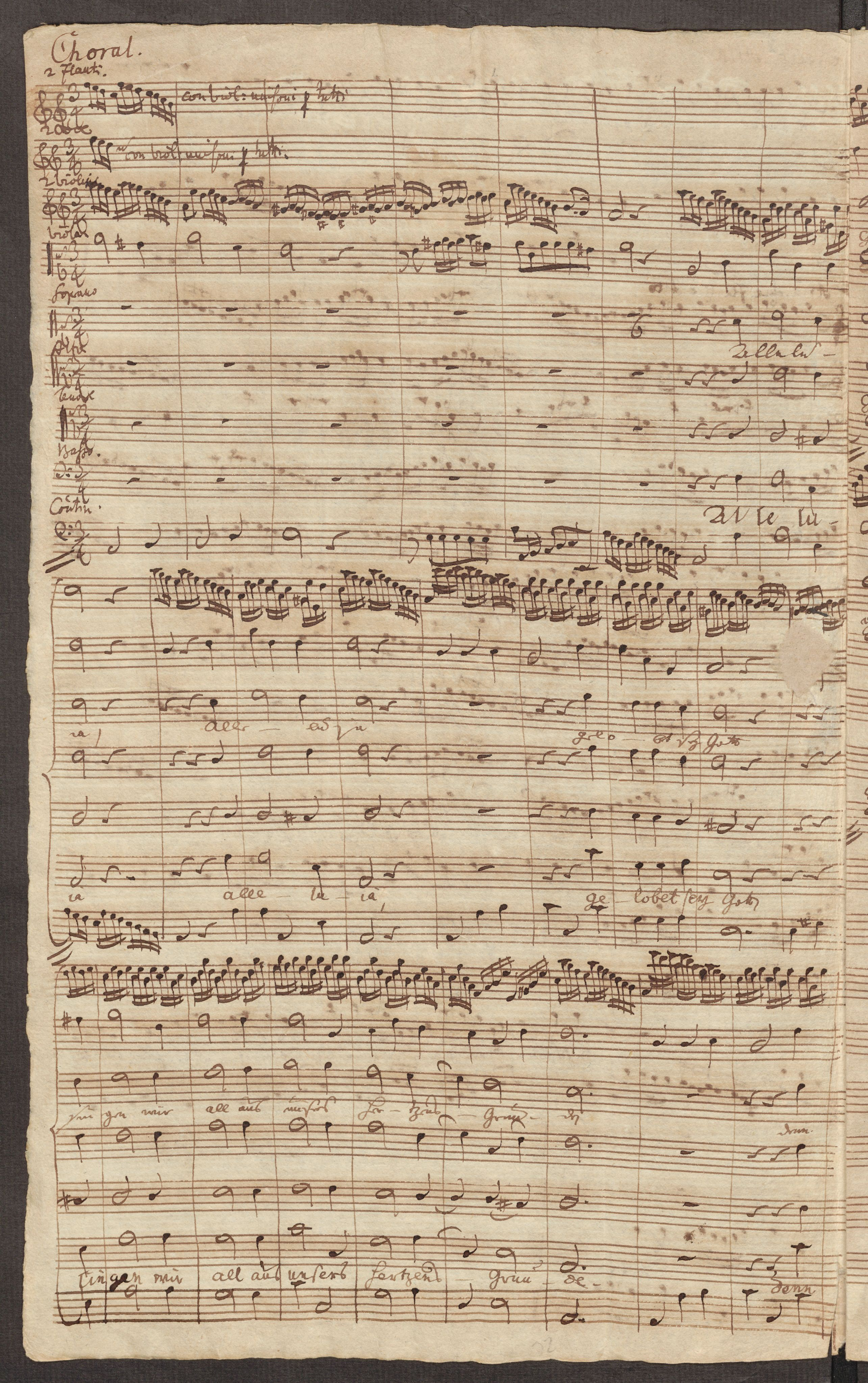
First page of the closing chorale of BWV 142 in Penzel's manuscript copy of 1756

The cantata is scored for three vocal soloists (alto, tenor and bass), a four-part choir, two alto recorders, two oboes, two violins, viola and continuo.

The piece has eight movements:

1. Sinfonia, an instrumental concerto for two alto recorders, two oboes and strings.
2. Chorus: Uns ist ein Kind geboren (For unto us a child is born), a double fugue with the first theme set to the text "Uns ist ein Kind geboren" and the second set to "Eins Sohn ist uns gegeben".
3. Aria (bass): Dein Geburtstag ist erschienen (So appears the Natal day). In this aria in E minor the bass is accompanied by two obbligato violins and continuo.
4. Chorus: Ich will den Namen Gottes loben (I will praise the name of God). This short choral movement begins with a fugato section in which the four vocal parts are accompanied by the first and second violins. After the fugal entries, the music is homophonic.
5. Aria (tenor): Jesu, dir sei Dank (Jesus, thanks be to you). In this relatively short da capo aria, the tenor is accompanied by two obbligato oboes.
6. Recitative (alto): Immanuel (Emmanuel!)
7. Aria (alto): Jesu, dir sei Preis (Praise be to you, Jesus). Set to new words, this aria is a transposition of the 5th movement from A minor to D minor, with the alto replacing the tenor and the two alto recorders replacing the oboes.
8. Chorus: Alleluia. Over an almost uninterrupted stream of semiquaver figures played in unison by alto recorders, oboes and violins, the choir sings the final four-part chorale line by line.

== Translations ==
In 1939, Sydney Biden provided the English translation for the cantata For us a child is born.

== Arrangements ==
In 1940, William Walton orchestrated the first bass aria in the cantata as dance music for Frederick Ashton's ballet The Wise Virgins. Arrangements of the final chorus for organ and one or more brass instruments have been published separately.

== Recordings ==
Recordings of the cantata include:

- Alsfelder Vokalensemble / I Febiarmionici, Wolfgang Helbich. The Apocryphal Bach Cantatas II. CPO, 2001.
- Choir and Orchestra "Pro Arte" Munich, Kurt Redel. J. S. Bach: Magnificat in D Major & Cantata BWV 142. Philips, 1964.
- Mannheim Bach Choir / Heidelberger Kammerorchester, Heinz Markus Göttsche. J. S. Bach: Cantatas BWV 62 & BWV 142. Da Camera, 1966.
- Capella Brugensis / Collegium instrumentale Brugense, Patrick Peire. 'Uns ist ein Kind geboren', Eufoda, 1972
- Kammerchor der Christuskirche Karlsruhe / L'arpa festante, Peter Gortner. Johann Kuhnau: Uns ist ein Kind geboren Weihnachtskantaten. Christophorus, 2024.
