= Ach lieben Christen seid getrost =

Lutheran hymn in German

- Lutheran hymn
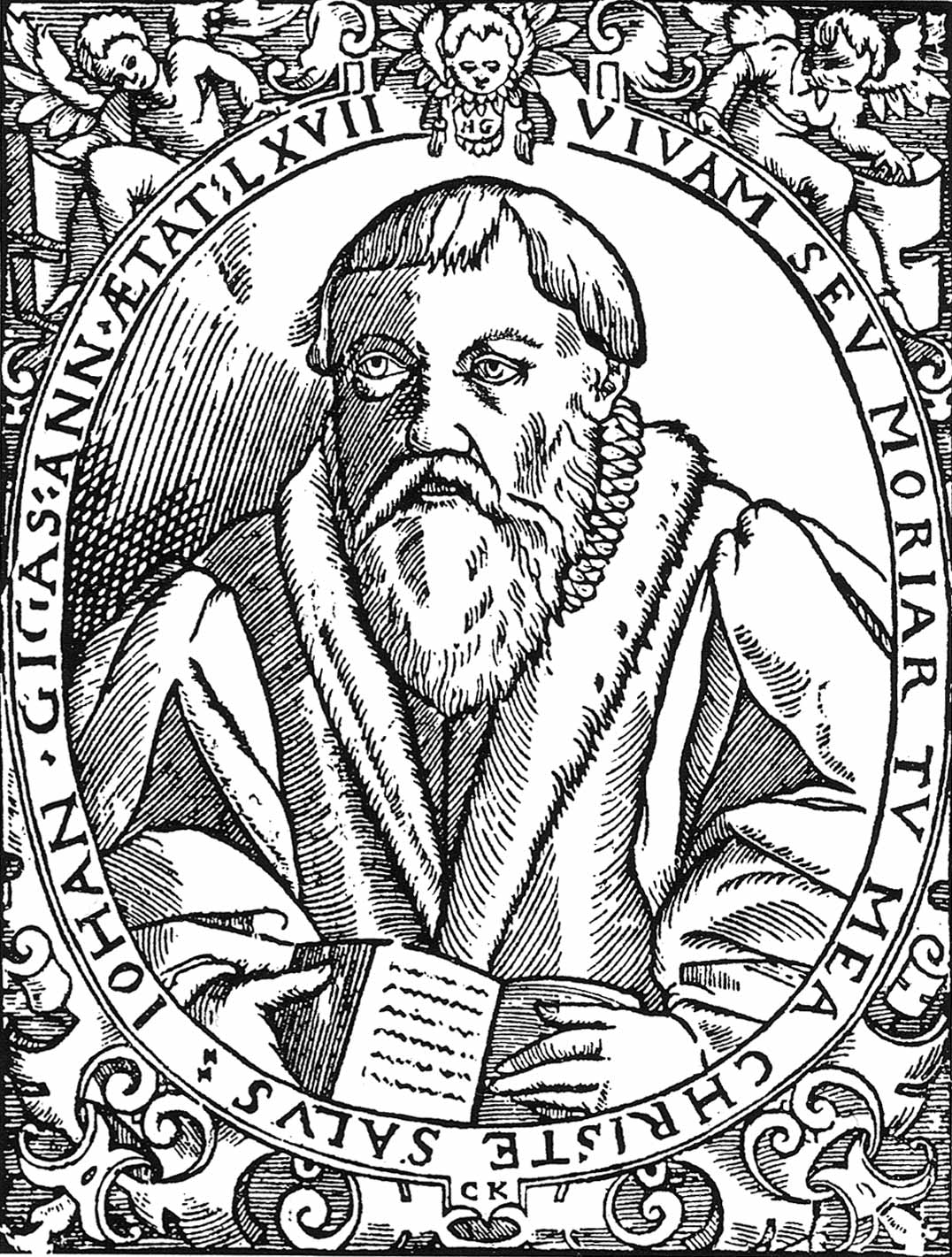
- Johannes Gigas, author of the lyrics
- English: Ah dear Christians, be comforted
- Written: 1561
- Text: by Johannes Gigas
- Language: German
- Melody: Zahn 4521b, 4441a and others
- Composed: 1529

"Ach lieben Christen seid getrost" (Ah dear Christians be comforted) is a Lutheran hymn in German with lyrics by Johannes Gigas, written in 1561. A penitential hymn, it was the basis for Bach's chorale cantata Ach, lieben Christen, seid getrost, BWV 114.

== History ==
Johannes Gigas, also called Johannes Henne, wrote a hymn of consolation and penitence. It appeared first in Frankfurt an der Oder in 1561, mentioning Gigas as the author ("durch Johan. Gigas"). It was part of a hymnal Gesangbüchlin in Augsburg in 1570, and of a Leipzig hymnal of 1586. In an 1817 hymnal, it appears in the section "Trost in Sterbegefahr" (Consolation in danger of death). It has also been described as a penitential hymn.

== Lyrics ==
The lyricist tries to give comfort to "dear Christians" (lieben Christen). From the second stanza, he uses the plural "uns" (us) including himself as part of a group united in the same situation. The text is in six stanzas of seven lines each:

Ach liebe Christen, seid getrost,
wie tut ihr so verzagen?
Weil uns der Herr heimsuchen tut,
laßt uns von Herzen sagen:
Die Straf' wir wohl verdienet han,
das muß bekennen jedermann,
niemand darf sich ausschließen..

In deine Hand uns geben wir,
o Gott, du lieber Vater,
denn unser Wandel ist bei dir,
hier wird uns nicht geraten.
Weil wir in dieser Hütte sein,
ist nur Elend, Trübsal und Pein,
bei dir der Freud' wir warten.

Kein' Frucht das Weizenkörnlein bringt,
es fall' denn in die Erden:
so muß auch unser ird'scher Leib
zu Staub und Asche werden,
eh' er kommt zu der Herrlichkeit,
die du, Herr Christ, uns hast bereit't
durch deinem Gang zum Vater.

Was wollen wir denn fürchten sehr
den Tod auf dieser Erden?
Es muß einmal gestorben sein,
O wohl ist hier gewesen,
welcher wie Simeon entschläft,
sein Sünd' erkennt, Christum ergreifst!
so muß man selig sterben

Dein' Seel' bedenk', bewahr dein'n Leib,
laß Gott den Vater sorgen,
sein' Engel deine Wächter sein,
b'hüt'n dich vor allem Argen.
Ja, wie die Henn' ihr' Küchelein
bedeckt mit ihren Flügelein,
so tut der Herr uns Armen.

Wir wachen oder schlafen ein,
so sind wir doch wir doch des Herren.
Auf Christum wir getaufet sein,
der kann dem Satan wehren.
Durch Adam auf uns kommt der Tod,
Christus hilft uns aus aller Not,
drum loben wir den Herren.

The lyricist is convinced that affliction may be a deserved punishment, and invites an attitude of penitent remorse, placing everything in God's hands. He compares man to a grain of wheat, meant to bear fruit, which is possible on fertile soil. He recommends dying in the manner of Simeon, who "recognises his sins, grasps Christ" (sein Sünd' erkennt, Christum ergreifst). In the fifth stanza, he compares the shelter of God for body and soul to a hen covering her chicks with her wings. Finally, he confirms that we belong to God whether we are awake or sleep, that we are helped by Christ in all need, and he ends with praise.

== Tune and music ==
Zahn 4521b is a hymn tune composed for "Ach lieben Christen seid getrost". The hymn has been associated with several other melodies, including the well-known tune of "Wo Gott der Herr nicht bei uns hält", Zahn 4441a.

Johann Sebastian Bach used the hymn, with the Zahn 4441a melody, in his chorale cantata Ach, lieben Christen, seid getrost, BWV 114, composed in 1724 for the 17th Sunday after Trinity. He used three stanzas of the original text, the first as a chorale fantasia, the third with the solo soprano singing, and he closed the work with a four-part setting of the final stanza. The chorale harmonisation BWV 256 is another setting of the hymn by Bach, using the same melody. Other extant uses by Bach of the Zahn 4441a tune refer to other hymn texts.
