= Carl Friedrich Barth =

German musician and music copyist (1734–1813)

Carl Friedrich Barth (1734–1813) was a German musician and music copyist.

== Life ==
Barth was born in Glauchau in 1734. Along with his elder brother, he enrolled at Leipzig´s Thomasschule in 1746. By his own account, he was a pupil of J.S. Bach. It is not known whether he was referring to private lessons, but it is possible because he began to copy manuscripts by Bach during the composer's lifetime. There are parts in his hand from a revival of the cantata Tue Rechnung! Donnerwort, BWV 168 in the 1740s.

After Bach's death in 1750, Barth worked with the new Thomaskantor (director of music) Gottlob Harrer as a prefect (choir director assistant). Following Harrer's death in 1755, Barth helped to run the musical establishment during the "interregnum": he has been described as taking the role of joint "interim music director" alongside the junior prefect Christian Friedrich Penzel until the arrival of Harrer's successor in 1756. This successor was Johann Friedrich Doles with whom Barth also worked.

In 1757, Barth went on to study at Leipzig University.

== Works copied by Barth ==
In 2003, Michael Maul and Peter Wollny settled a mystery about a previously unidentified copyist for Liebster Gott, wenn werd ich sterben BWV 8 (a chorale cantata which was revived in the mid 1750s). He had been described by Göttingen musicologists Dürr and Kobayashi as the "Doles scribe" (Schreiber der Doles-Partituren). Maul and Wollny discovered that the copyist in question was Barth.
