= Johannes Gigas =

German theologian and hymn writer (1514–1581)

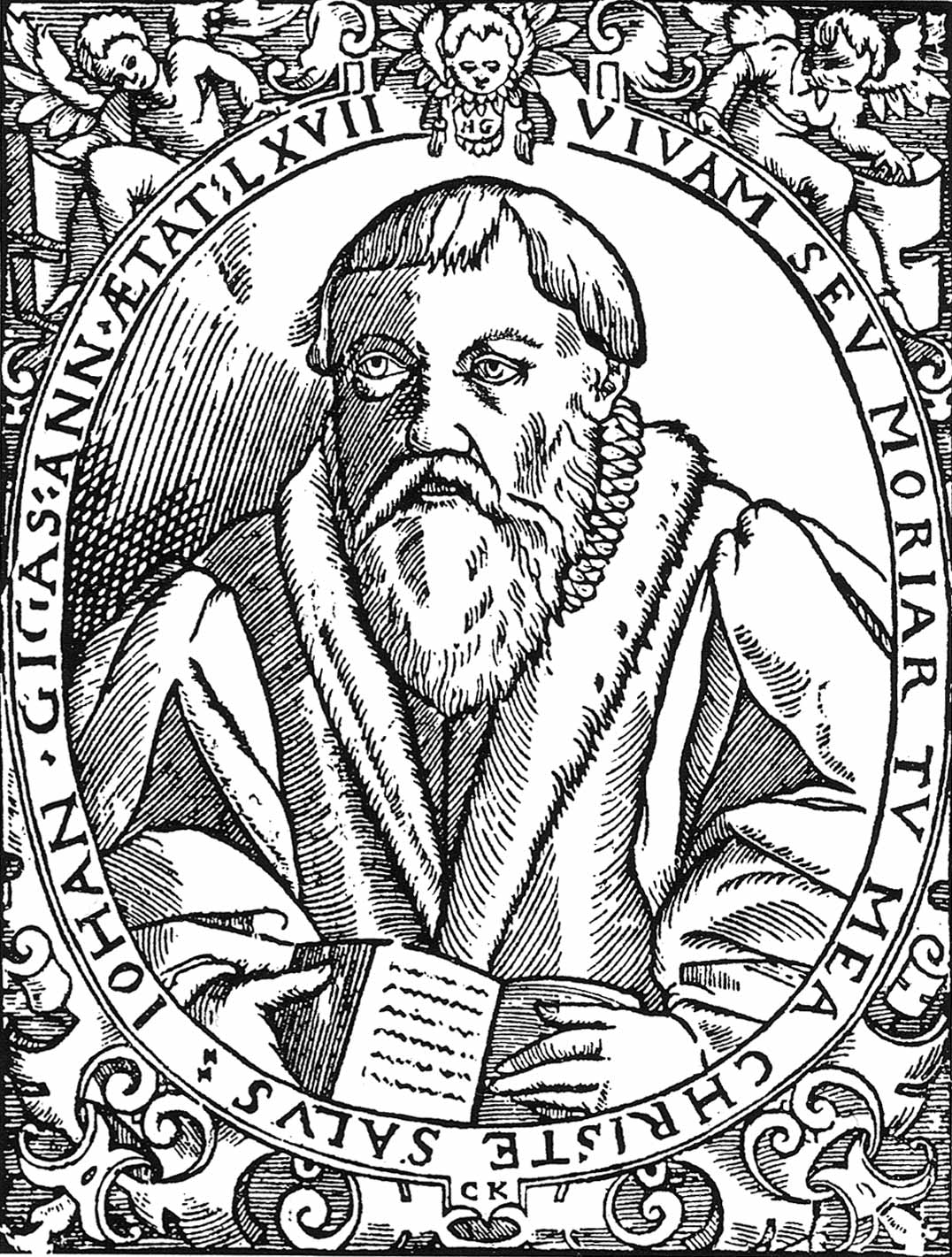
Johannes Gigas

Johannes Gigas (22 February 1514 – 12 July 1581) was a German Protestant theologian, hymn writer, educator and Reformer. Gigas was born in Nordhausen, Thuringia, and died in Schweidnitz (now Świdnica, Silesia, Poland).

The libretto of Ach, lieben Christen, seid getrost, BWV 114, a chorale cantata by Johann Sebastian Bach, was based on "Ach lieben Christen seid getrost", a hymn text by Gigas.
