= John Troutbeck (diplomat) =

British diplomat

Sir John Monro Troutbeck, GBE KCMG (2 November 1894 – 28 September 1971) was a British diplomat.

== Origins ==
He was the son of John Troutbeck (1860–1912), a solicitor and Coroner of Westminster, and his wife Harriet Elizabeth Monro. His grandfather was the Rev Dr John Troutbeck and his uncle by marriage was Sir William Henry Hadow.

== Career ==
He served as Ambassador to Iraq between 1951 and 1954, succeeding Sir Henry Mack.

He retired in 1954, served as UK Member of the Saar Referendum Commission in 1955 and was Chairman of the Save the Children Fund 1956–1962.

He was appointed a Commander of the Order of Saint Michael and Saint George in 1939, a Knight Commander of the same order in 1948, and in 1955 he was made an Ordinary Knight Grand Cross of the Most Excellent Order of the British Empire.

He died in Horsham, West Sussex in 1971.
