= Ach, lieben Christen, seid getrost, BWV 114 =

Chorale cantata by Johann Sebastian Bach

Ach, lieben Christen, seid getrost
- BWV 114
- Chorale cantata by J. S. Bach
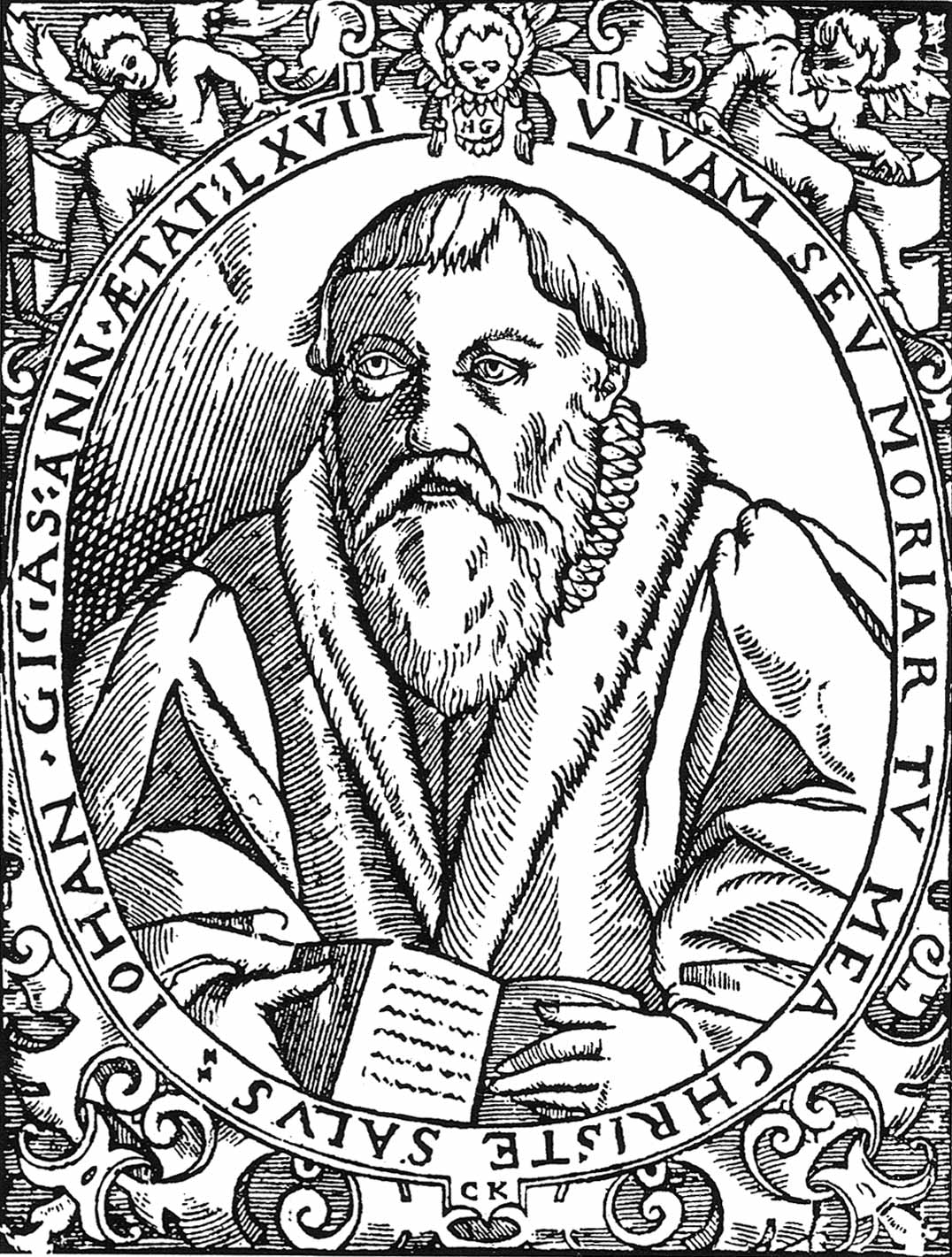
- Johannes Gigas, the author of the hymn
- Occasion: 17th Sunday after Trinity
- Chorale: "Ach, lieben Christen, seid getrost" by Johannes Gigas
- Performed: 1 October 1724: Leipzig
- Movements: seven
- Vocal: SATB choir and solo
- Instrumental: corno; flauto traverso; 2 oboes; 2 violins; viola; continuo

Johann Sebastian Bach composed the church cantata Ach, lieben Christen, seid getrost (Ah, dear Christians, be comforted), BWV 114, in Leipzig for the 17th Sunday after Trinity and first performed it on 1 October 1724. It is based on a 1561 hymn of penitence by Johannes Gigas. Its tune is featured in three of the work's seven movements.

Ach, lieben Christen, seid getrost' belongs to Bach's chorale cantata cycle, the second cycle during his tenure as Thomaskantor that began in 1723. The text retains the first, third and last stanza of the chorale unchanged; the text of the other stanzas was paraphrased by an unknown librettist into arias and recitatives, including references to the prescribed gospel about the healing of a man with dropsy. The first movement is a chorale fantasia, and the work is closed by a four-part chorale setting.

Bach scored the cantata for four vocal parts, a four-part choir and a Baroque instrumental ensemble of a horn to reinforce the chorale tune, a flauto traverso, oboes, strings and basso continuo.

== History and words ==
Bach composed the cantata in his second year as Thomaskantor (director of music) in Leipzig for the 17th Sunday after Trinity. That year, Bach composed a cycle of chorale cantatas, begun on the first Sunday after Trinity of 1724. The prescribed readings for the Sunday were from the Epistle to the Ephesians, the admonition to keep the unity of the Spirit (Ephesians 4:1–6), and from the Gospel of Luke, healing a man with dropsy on the Sabbath (Luke 14:1–11).

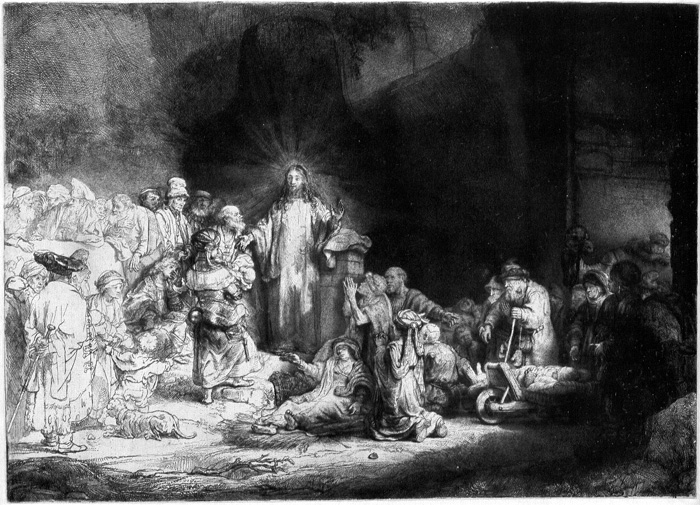
Jesus heals the sick by Rembrandt, as in the prescribed gospel, 1649

The cantata is based on a song of penitence, "Ach, lieben Christen, seid getrost", in six stanzas by Johannes Gigas (1561), sung to the melody of "Wo Gott der Herr nicht bei uns hält". The hymn is only distantly related to the readings, concentrating on the thought that the Christians sin and deserve punishment, but may be raised to joy in a "seliger Tod" (blessed death). An unknown librettist retained the first, third and sixth stanza as movements 1, 4 and 7 of the cantata. He derived movements 2 and 3, aria and recitative, from stanza 2, movement 5, another aria, from stanza 4, and the last recitative from stanza 5. In movement 3, he deviated from the song text, expanding in connection to the gospel that sin in general is comparable to the dropsy, "diese Sündenwassersucht ist zum Verderben da und wird dir tödlich sein" (this sinful dropsy leads to destruction and will be fatal to you), and alluding to Adam's fall, caused by self-exaltation in the forbidden quest to be like God, "Der Hochmut aß vordem von der verbotnen Frucht, Gott gleich zu werden" (Pride first ate the forbidden fruit, to be like God).

=== Performance history ===
Bach first performed the cantata on 1 October 1724, only two days after the first performance of his chorale cantata Herr Gott, dich loben alle wir, BWV 130, on the feast of Michael, the archangel, 29 September 1724. Bach revived the work in the 1740s. After Bach's death, it was performed by the Thomanerchor in the 1750s along with other chorale cantatas. This interest in the cycle suggests that the chorale cantatas had been well received in Leipzig. However, given the youth of Barth and Penzel, two former pupils of Bach who were the interim directors of the choir when the cantata was revived, it is not clear how closely they were able to follow Bach's style of performance.

== Music ==
=== Structure and scoring ===
Bach structured the cantata in seven movements. The chorale tune is used in movements 1, 4 and 7, as a chorale fantasia, a chorale sung by a solo voice, and a four-part closing chorale. These three movements frame two sets of aria and recitative. Bach scored the work for four vocal soloists (soprano (S), alto (A), tenor (T) and bass (B)), a four-part choir, and a Baroque instrumental ensemble of horn (Co) to double the soprano, flauto traverso (Ft), two oboes (Ob), two violins (Vl), viola (Va), and basso continuo. The title of the autograph score reads: "Dom: 17 post Trin: / Ach lieben Xsten seyd getrost / a 4 Voc: / Corno / 2 Hautbois / 2 Violini / Viola / con / Continuo / di / Sign:JS:Bach".

In the following table of the movements, the keys and time signatures are taken from the Bach scholar Alfred Dürr, using the symbol for common time (4/4). The instruments are shown separately for brass, woodwinds and strings, while the continuo, playing throughout, is not shown.

Movements of Ach, lieben Christen, seid getrost
No.	Title	Text	Type	Vocal	Brass	Woods	Strings	Key	Time
1	Ach, lieben Christen, seid getrost	Gigas	Chorus	SATB	Co	2Ob	2Vl Va	G minor	common time
2	Wo wird diesem Jammertale	anon.	Aria	T		Ft		D minor	3/4
3	O Sünder, trage mit Geduld	anon.	Recitative	B					common time
4	Kein Frucht das Weizenkörnlein bringt	Gigas	Chorale	S				G minor	common time
5	Du machst, o Tod, mir nun nicht ferner bange	anon.	Aria	A		Ob	2Vl Va	B-flat major	common time
6	Indes bedenke deine Seele	anon.	Recitative	T					common time
7	Wir wachen oder schlafen ein	Gigas	Chorale	SATB	Co	2Ob	2Vl Va	G minor	common time

=== Movements ===
==== 1 ====
In the opening chorale fantasia, "Ach, lieben Christen, seid getrost" (Ah, dear Christians, be comforted), Bach expresses two thoughts of the text, comfort and fear, by contrasting themes that appear simultaneously in the instruments: an assertive theme is derived from the melody and played by the two oboes and first violins, an "anxious" one in the second violins and the continuo. The soprano sings the melody as a cantus firmus, doubled by the horn, while the lower voices are set partly in expressive imitation, partly in homophony. They are treated differently to reflect the meaning of the text. The Bach scholar Klaus Hofmann compares the movement to the opening of the cantata Jesu, der du meine Seele, BWV 78, written three weeks earlier: both "a sort of chaconne" in G minor, with a "French style" bass as "the expression of mourning and lamentation".

==== 2 ====
The first aria is set for tenor with a virtuoso flute, "Wo wird in diesem Jammertale" (Where, in this valley of suffering). It contrasts again the anxious question "Wo wird ... vor meinen Geist die Zuflucht sein?" (Where ... is the refuge of my spirit?) and the trusting "Allein zu Jesu Vaterhänden will ich mich in der Schwachheit wenden" (However, to Jesus' fatherly hands I will turn in my weakness), The anxious question returns in the da capo form.

==== 3 ====
The first recitative, "O Sünder, trage mit Geduld" (O sinner, bear with patience), begins secco, but expresses the contrasting words "erhebst" (exalt) and "erniedrig" (humbled) from the Gospel as an arioso.

==== 4 ====
The chorale stanza, "Kein Frucht das Weizenkörnlein bringt" (The grain of wheat bears no fruit), is set for the soprano, accompanied only by the continuo. In its "starkness of the unembellished chorale", it is the centerpiece of the cantata.

==== 5 ====
The alto aria, "Du machst, o Tod, mir nun nicht ferner bange" (You make me, o death, no longer fearful now), is the only movement of the cantata in a major key. A shift to minor on the words "Es muß ja so einmal gestorben sein" (One day, indeed, one must die) is even more striking.

==== 6 ====
A final recitative "Indes bedenke deine Seele" (Therefore, consider your soul) invites the listener to turn body and soul to God.

==== 7 ====
The cantata ends with a four-part setting of the chorale melody, "Wir wachen oder schlafen ein" (Whether we wake or fall asleep), expressing "confidence in God".

== Recordings ==
The listing is taken from the Bach Cantatas Website. Ensembles playing period instruments in historically informed performance are marked by green background.

Recordings of Ach, lieben Christen, seid getrost, BWV 114
Title	Conductor / Choir / Orchestra	Soloists	Label	Year	Orch. type
Die Bach Kantate Vol. 52	Helmuth Rilling: Frankfurter Kantorei; Gächinger Kantorei; Bach-Collegium Stuttgart	Gabriele Schnaut; Julia Hamari; Kurt Equiluz; Wolfgang Schöne	Hänssler	1974 / 1981	Chamber
J. S. Bach: Das Kantatenwerk • Complete Cantatas • Les Cantates, Folge / Vol. 29 – BWV 43–46	Gustav Leonhardt Knabenchor Hannover Leonhardt-Consort	boy soloist of the Knabenchor Hannover; René Jacobs; Kurt Equiluz; Max van Egmond	Telefunken	1980	Period
Bach Edition Vol. 5 – Cantatas Vol. 2	Pieter Jan Leusink Holland Boys Choir Netherlands Bach Collegium	Ruth Holton; Sytse Buwalda; Knut Schoch; Bas Ramselaar	Brilliant Classics	1999	Period
J. S. Bach: Complete Cantatas Vol. 12	Ton Koopman Amsterdam Baroque Orchestra & Choir	Lisa Larsson; Annette Markert; Christoph Prégardien; Klaus Mertens	Antoine Marchand	2000	Period
Bach Cantatas Vol. 9: Lund / Leipzig / For the 17th Sunday after Trinity / For the 18th Sunday after Trinity	John Eliot Gardiner Monteverdi Choir English Baroque Soloists	Katharine Fuge; Charles Humphries; Mark Padmore; Stephan Loges	Soli Deo Gloria	2000	Period
J. S. Bach: Cantatas Vol. 25 – Cantatas from Leipzig 1724 – BWV 78, 99, 114	Masaaki Suzuki Bach Collegium Japan	Yukari Nonoshita; Daniel Taylor; Makoto Sakurada; Peter Kooy	BIS	2003	Period
