= John Troutbeck =

English clergyman (1832-1899)

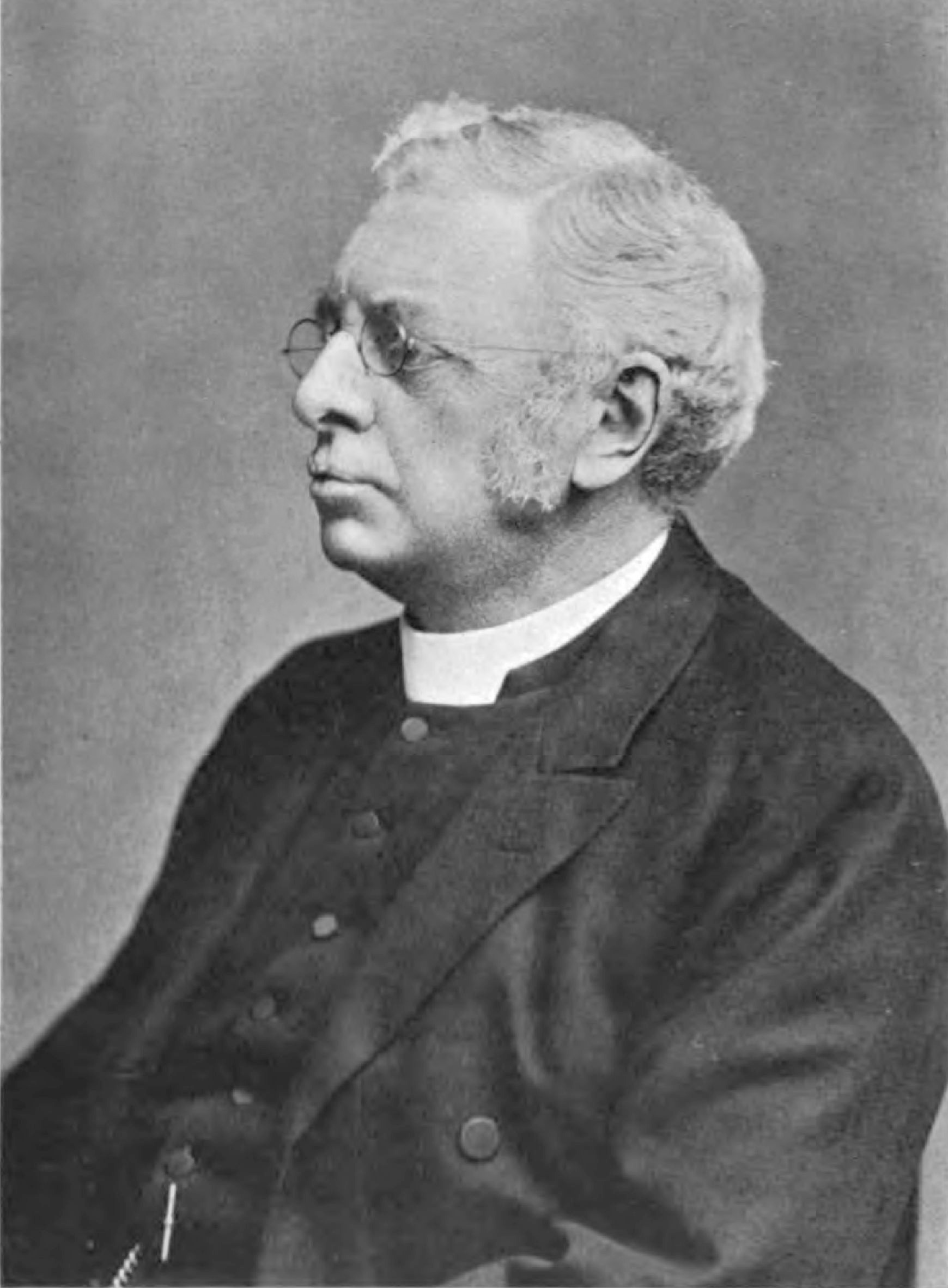
John Troutbeck, 1899

Reverend Doctor John Troutbeck (12 November 1832, Blencowe – 11 October 1899, London) was an English clergyman, translator and musicologist, a Canon Precentor of Westminster Abbey and Chaplain-in-Ordinary to Queen Victoria, whose renown rests on his translation into English of various continental choral texts including the major works of J.S. Bach. He additionally translated oratorios by Beethoven, Brahms, Dvořák, Gounod, Liszt, Saint-Saëns, Schumann and Weber, as well as secular operas by Mozart, Gluck and Wagner. He also compiled psalters and hymnals and worked on the Revised Version translation of the Bible.

== Origins ==
Troutbeck was born in the village of Blencowe in the parish of Dacre in Cumberland on 12 November 1832. He was the son of a country gentleman, George Troutbeck (1795–1848), and his wife Eliza Stephenson (1799–1877). He had a plaque erected in the Troutbeck Chapel, built in 1443 in the church of St Mary's-on-the-Hill in Chester, which acknowledged his ancestors buried there, including Sir William Troutbeck, Chamberlain of Chester, killed at the Battle of Blore Heath in 1459.

== Career ==
He was educated at Rugby and at University College, Oxford, where he graduated with a Bachelor of Arts in 1856, a Master of Arts in 1858, and was later awarded a Doctorate in Divinity in 1883.

Ordained in 1855, he was vicar of Dacre to 1864, Precentor of Manchester Cathedral from 1865 to 1869, a Minor Canon and later Canon Precentor at Westminster Abbey from 1869, and a Chaplain in Ordinary to Queen Victoria.

== Translations ==
Troutbeck has been credited as a "prolific" and "indefatigable" translator of continental European oratorio and opera texts.

All of J.S.Bach's major choral works, including the Christmas Oratorio (1874), the Magnificat (1874), and the St Matthew and St John Passions (1894 and 1896 respectively), were translated by him for the music publisher Novello. He also translated nine of Bach's cantatas, with the same publisher. Until 1999 Troutbeck's Christmas Oratorio (1874) was the only complete English version, as was his Magnificat until a new edition was published in 2000.

Also brought by him to English-speaking singers and audiences were, amongst others, Beethoven's Mount of Olives, Karel Bendl's Water Sprite's Revenge, Brahms's Song of Destiny, Félicien David's The Desert, Dvořák's Mass in D, Patriotic Hymn, Spectre's Bride and St Ludmilla, Gounod's Redemption, and Weber's Jubilee Cantata.

His opera translations included Mozart's Cosi fan tutte and Die Entführung aus dem Serail, Gluck's Orfeo ed Euridice, Iphigénie en Tauride, and Iphigénie en Aulide, and Wagner's Der fliegende Holländer.

Troutbeck was also a compiler of psalters and hymnals including the Manchester Psalter and Chant Book (1867), the Westminster Abbey Hymn Book (1883) and the Catholic Paragraph Psalter (1894). and from 1870 to 1881 was secretary of the committee translating the Revised Version of the Greek New Testament.

== Family ==
On 3 September 1856 in Liverpool, he married Elizabeth, daughter of businessman Robinson Duckworth. They had four children:

- Georgina (1858–1947).
- John (1860–1912), who was the father of the diplomat Sir John Monro Troutbeck.
- Edith (1862–1937), who married the academic and musicologist Sir William Henry Hadow.
- Henry (1866–1923).

== Death ==
Dying on 11 October 1899, at 4 Dean's Yard, Westminster, he was buried beside his wife in the cloisters of Westminster Abbey. His will, leaving effects of over 22,000 pounds, was proved on 18 November by his four children.

== Troutbeck’s son – the Coroner ==
John Troutbeck's son, also named John Troutbeck, was the Westminster Coroner who opened the inquest, in October 1888, on the remains of a woman discovered in a vault of a new police office on the Thames Embankment – the case known as the Whitehall Mystery.

Troutbeck, the Coroner, who was appointed by the Dean and Chapter of Westminster, was, like his father, an accomplished linguist who often “dispensed with the services of interpreters at his enquiries.” He was a skilled musician, playing the viola in the orchestra at the coronation of King George V at Westminster Abbey in June 1911.
