= Christian Friedrich Penzel =

German musician (1737–1801)

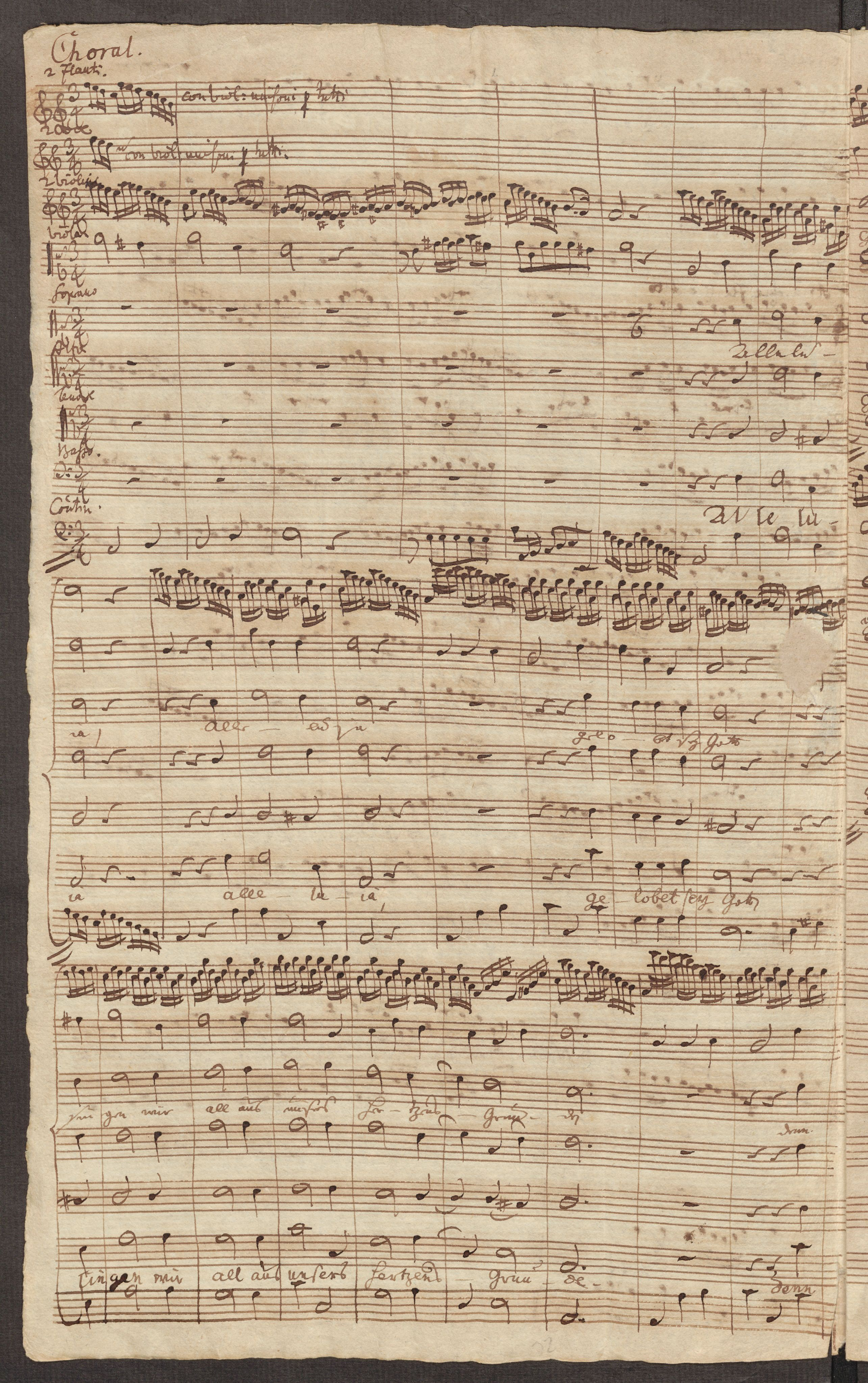
One of Penzel's manuscripts from the 1750s. The work in question, a cantata catalogued as BWV 142, was attributed by Penzel to Bach, but the attribution is now regarded as spurious.

Christian Friedrich Penzel (25 November 1737 – 14 March 1801) was a German musician. Although he was a composer in his own right, he is remembered more for his association with Johann Sebastian Bach. He was one of Bach's last pupils. He continued to be involved in performances of Bach's music after the composer's death, and he is known for making copies of some of Bach's works.

== Life and career ==
Born in Oelsnitz, Vogtland on 25 November 1737, Penzel was the son of a church sexton. He began his formal musical training in his native city where he studied under the cantor J. G. Nacke. He entered the St. Thomas School, Leipzig in 1749 while Bach held the position of Thomaskantor. Bach died the following year, and, given Penzel's age at the time, this raises the question of the type of teaching Penzel received from Bach. Penzel described himself as a pupil of Bach, but perhaps he was simply referring to general teaching that Bach gave his choirboys and instrumentalists. It would seem unlikely that he attended private lessons, but this cannot be ruled out.

After Bach's death, Penzel became a prefect at the school under Bach's successor Gottlob Harrer. The position involved him directing the boys' choir (Thomanerchor) on occasion. Harrer needed the services of a deputy increasingly because he had health problems: he died in July 1755 while taking the waters at Carlsbad. Following Harrer's death, Penzel helped to run the musical establishment during the "interregnum": he has been described as taking the role of joint "interim music director" alongside the senior prefect Karl Friedrich Barth until the arrival of Harrer's successor in 1756. There is documentary evidence that the two prefects revived some of Bach's church music in this period.

From 1756 through 1761 Penzel studied the law at Leipzig University. He attempted to succeed his father as church sexton, but was unsuccessful. In 1765 he was appointed Kantor at Merseburg; succeeding A.F. Graun in that post. He died in Merseburg on 14 March 1801.

== Works copied by Penzel ==
The music sung by the Thomanerchor in the 1750s included revivals of Bach's vocal music. Among the works selected were chorale cantatas such as Ach, lieben Christen, seid getrost, BWV 114 (first performed in 1724), and Wachet auf, ruft uns die Stimme, BWV 140 (first performed in 1731). It was possibly in the context of preparing music for the choir that Penzel developed the habit of copying manuscripts of Bach's music. Penzel's fellow prefect, Carl Friedrich Barth, also copied Bach manuscripts. Barth had enrolled in the Thomasschule in 1746 and began to copy Bach manuscripts during the composer's lifetime.

For several Bach cantatas Penzel's copy is the oldest surviving source. The school owned sets of parts for church music by Bach, but it is not always clear where Penzel obtained his source material. He also copied instrumental works, including organ music (such as chorale preludes) and orchestral music (such as the Brandenburg Concerto No. 1 in what appears to be its earliest version). He was on good terms with Bach's eldest son Wilhelm Friedemann Bach, who inherited a number of manuscripts on his father's death.
