= Gottlob Harrer =

German composer and choir leader

Johann Gottlob Harrer, more commonly known as Gottlob Harrer, (8 May 1703 – 9 July 1755) was a German composer and choir leader. From 1731-1750 he worked as private musician to Count Heinrich von Brühl. In 1750 he succeeded Johann Sebastian Bach as Thomaskantor at the St. Thomas School, Leipzig; a post he maintained until his death in 1755.

== Life ==
Johann Gottlob Harrer was born in Görlitz on May 8, 1703. He originally intended to become a lawyer, and studied the law at the University of Leipzig from 1722-1725. Through the patronage of Count Heinrich von Brühl, he trained as a musician in Italy. Upon completing his education he returned to Germany where he served the count as his private musician in Dresden from 1731-1750.

Following the death of Johann Sebastian Bach in 1750, Harrer became his successor as Thomaskantor at the St. Thomas School, Leipzig. He still held the post when he died in Carlsbad in July 1755, but deputies had had to fulfill his duties on occasion, because of his declining health.

He composed much instrumental music, including 27 symphonies, 24 orchestral suites, 51 flute duets and a number of harpsichord sonatas. He also wrote two masses for choir and orchestra, one mass for unaccompanied voices, 47 cantatas and a number of oratorios, passions, psalms, and motets.
