= List of songs and arias by Johann Sebastian Bach =

Songs and arias by Johann Sebastian Bach are compositions listed in Chapter 6 of the Bach-Werke-Verzeichnis (BWV 439–524), which also includes the Quodlibet. Most of the songs and arias included in this list are set for voice and continuo. Most of them are also spiritual, i.e. hymn settings, although a few have a worldly theme. The best known of these, "Bist du bei mir", was however not composed by Bach.

An aria by Bach was rediscovered in the 21st century, and was assigned the number BWV 1127. Further hymn settings and arias by Bach are included in his cantatas, motets, masses, passions, oratorios and chorale harmonisations (BWV 1–438 and later additions). The second Anhang of the BWV catalogue also lists a few songs of doubtful authenticity.

== Songs, arias and Quodlibet, BWV 439–524 ==
Legend to the table
| column | | content |
|---|---|---|
| 1 | BWV | Bach-Werke-Verzeichnis (lit. 'Bach-works-catalogue'; BWV) numbers. Anhang (Annex; Anh.) numbers are indicated as follows: preceded by I: in Anh. I (lost works) of BWV^{1} (1950 first edition of the BWV); preceded by II: in Anh. II (doubtful works) of BWV^{1}; preceded by III: in Anh. III (spurious works) of BWV^{1}; preceded by N: new Anh. numbers in BWV^{2} (1990) and/or BWV^{2a} (1998) |
| 2 | ^{2a} | Section in which the composition appears in BWV^{2a}: Chapters of the main catalogue indicated by Arabic numerals (1-13); Anh. sections indicated by Roman numerals (I–III); Reconstructions published in the NBE indicated by "R" |
| 3 | Date | Date associated with the completion of the listed version of the composition. Exact dates (e.g. for most cantatas) usually indicate the assumed date of first (public) performance. When the date is followed by an abbreviation in brackets (e.g. JSB for Johann Sebastian Bach) it indicates the date of that person's involvement with the composition as composer, scribe or publisher. |
| 4 | Name | Name of the composition: if the composition is known by a German incipit, that German name is preceded by the composition type (e.g. cantata, chorale prelude, motet, ...) |
| 5 | Key | Key of the composition |
| 6 | Scoring | See scoring table below for the abbreviations used in this column |
| 7 | BG | Bach Gesellschaft-Ausgabe (BG edition; BGA): numbers before the colon indicate the volume in that edition. After the colon an Arabic numeral indicates the page number where the score of the composition begins, while a Roman numeral indicates a description of the composition in the Vorwort (Preface) of the volume. |
| 8 | NBE | New Bach Edition (German: Neue Bach-Ausgabe, NBA): Roman numerals for the series, followed by a slash, and the volume number in Arabic numerals. A page number, after a colon, refers to the "Score" part of the volume. Without such page number, the composition is only described in the "Critical Commentary" part of the volume. The volumes group Bach's compositions by genre: 1. Cantatas (Vol. 1–34: church cantatas grouped by occasion; Vol. 35–40: secular cantatas; Vol. 41: Varia); 2. Masses, Passions, Oratorios (12 volumes); 3. Motets, Chorales, Lieder (4 volumes); 4. Organ Works (11 volumes); 5. Keyboard and Lute Works (14 volumes); 6. Chamber Music (5 volumes); 7. Orchestral Works (7 volumes); 8. Canons, Musical Offering, Art of Fugue (3 volumes); 9. Addenda (approximately 7 volumes) |
| 9 | Additional info | may include: "after" – indicating a model for the composition; "by" – indicating the composer of the composition (if different from Johann Sebastian Bach); "in" – indicating the oldest known source for the composition; "pasticcio" – indicating a composition with parts of different origin; "see" – composition renumbered in a later edition of the BWV; "text" – by text author, or, in source; Provenance of standard texts and tunes, such as Lutheran hymns and their chorale melodies, Latin liturgical texts (e.g. Magnificat) and common tunes (e.g. Folia), are not usually indicated in this column. For an overview of such resources used by Bach, see individual composition articles, and overviews in, e.g., Chorale cantata (Bach)#Bach's chorale cantatas, List of chorale harmonisations by Johann Sebastian Bach#Chorale harmonisations in various collections and List of organ compositions by Johann Sebastian Bach#Chorale Preludes. |
| 10 | BD | Bach Digital Work page |

Legend for abbreviations in "Scoring" column
Voices (see also SATB)
| a | A | b | B | s | S | t | T | v | | | V | |
|---|---|---|---|---|---|---|---|---|---|---|---|---|
| alto (solo part) | alto (choir part) | bass (solo part) | bass (choir part) | soprano (solo part) | soprano (choir part) | tenor (solo part) | tenor (choir part) | voice (includes parts for unspecified voices or instruments as in some canons) | | | vocal music for unspecified voice type | |
Winds and battery (bold = soloist)
| Bas | Bel | Cnt | Fl | Hn | Ob | Oba | Odc | Tai | Tbn | Tdt | Tmp | Tr |
| bassoon (can be part of Bc, see below) | bell(s) (musical bells) | cornett, cornettino | flute (traverso, flauto dolce, piccolo, flauto basso) | natural horn, corno da caccia, corno da tirarsi, lituo | oboe | oboe d'amore | oboe da caccia | taille | trombone | tromba da tirarsi | timpani | tromba (natural trumpet, clarino trumpet) |
Strings and keyboard (bold = soloist)
| Bc | | Hc | Kb | Lu | Lw | Org | Str | Va | Vc | Vdg | Vl | Vne |
| basso continuo: Vdg, Hc, Vc, Bas, Org, Vne and/or Lu | | harpsichord | keyboard (Hc, Lw, Org or clavichord) | lute, theorbo | Lautenwerck (lute-harpsichord) | organ (/man. = manualiter, without pedals) | strings: Vl I, Vl II and Va | viola(s), viola d'amore, violetta | violoncello, violoncello piccolo | viola da gamba | violin(s), violino piccolo | violone, violone grosso |

Background colours
| Colour | Meaning |
|---|---|
| green | extant or clearly documented partial or complete manuscript (copy) by Bach and/or first edition under Bach's supervision |
| yellow | extant or clearly documented manuscript (copy) or print edition, in whole or in part, by close relative, i.e. brother (J. Christoph), wife (A. M.), son (W. F. / C. P. E. / J. C. F. / J. Christian) or son-in-law (Altnickol) |
| orange-brown | extant or clearly documented manuscript (copy) by close friend and/or pupil (Kellner, Krebs, Kirnberger, Walther, ...), or distant family member |

Songs, arias and Quodlibet in Chapter 6 of BWV^{2a}
| BWV | ^{2a} | Date | Name | Key | Scoring | BG | NBE | Additional info | BD |
|---|---|---|---|---|---|---|---|---|---|
| 439 | 6. | 1735–1736 or earlier | song "Ach, dass nicht die letzte Stunde" (Schemelli #831; tune #56) | | V Bc | 39: 279 | III/2.1: 210 | ↔ Z 6721; text by Neumeister | 00509 |
| 440 | 6. | 1735–1736 or earlier | song "Auf, auf! die rechte Zeit ist hier" (Schemelli #171; tune #11) | | V Bc | 39: 279 | III/2.1: 123 | ↔ Z 705; text by Opitz | 00510 |
| 441 | 6. | c. 1735 or earlier | chorale setting "Auf, auf, mein Herz, mit Freuden" | F maj. | SATB | | III/2.1: 67 | after Z 5243; text by Gerhardt | 00511 |
| 441 | 6. | 1735–1736 or earlier | song "Auf, auf, mein Herz, mit Freuden" (Schemelli #320; tune #27) | F maj. | V Bc | 39: 279 | III/2.1: 152 | after Z 5243; text by Gerhardt | 00511 |
| 442 | 6. | 1735–1736 or earlier | song "Beglückter Stand getreuer Seelen" (Schemelli #570; tune #39) | | V Bc | 39: 280 | III/2.1: 176 | after Z 5970; text by Bonin | 00512 |
| 443 | 6. | 1735–1736 or earlier | song "Beschränkt, ihr Weisen dieser Welt" (Schemelli #689; tune #47) | | V Bc | 39: 280 | III/2.1: 192 | ↔ Z 7765; text by Wegleiter | 00513 |
| 444 | 6. | 1735–1736 or earlier | song "Brich entzwei, mein armes Herze" (Schemelli #303; tune #24) | | V Bc | 39: 280 | III/2.1: 146 | after Z 7110–7111a; → Z 7111b; text by Trommer | 00514 |
| 445 | 6. | 1735–1736 or earlier | song "Brunnquell aller Güter" (Schemelli #335; tune #29) | | V Bc | 39: 281 | III/2.1: 156 | after Z 6252b; text by Franck, J. | 00515 |
| 446 | 6. | 1735–1736 or earlier | song "Der lieben Sonnen Licht und Pracht" (Schemelli #39; tune #2) | | V Bc | 39: 281 | III/2.1: 106 | after Z 5659; text by Scriver | 00516 |
| 447 | 6. | 1735–1736 or earlier | song "Der Tag ist hin, die Sonne gehet nieder" (Schemelli #40; tune #3) | | V Bc | 39: 281 | III/2.1: 108 | after Z 923; ↔ BWV 297; text by Rube | 00517 |
| 448 | 6. | 1735–1736 or earlier | song "Der Tag mit seinem Lichte" (Schemelli #43; tune #4) | | V Bc | 39: 282 | III/2.1: 110 | after Z 7512b; text by Gerhardt | 00518 |
| 449 | 6. | 1735–1736 or earlier | song "Dich bet ich an, mein höchster Gott" (Schemelli #396; tune #31) | | V Bc | 39: 282 | III/2.1: 160 | ↔ Z 2437; text by Olearius, J. G. | 00519 |
| 450 | 6. | 1735–1736 or earlier | song "Die bittre Leidenszeit beginnet abermal" (Schemelli #258; tune #17) | | V Bc | 39: 282 | III/2.1: 134 | after Z 7429; text by Elmenhorst | 00520 |
| 451 | 6. | 1735–1736 or earlier | song "Die güldne Sonne" (Schemelli #13; tune #1) | | V Bc | 39: 283 | III/2.1: 104 | after Z 8015; text by Gerhardt | 00521 |
| 452 | 6. | 1735–1736 or earlier | song "Dir, dir, Jehova, will ich singen" (Schemelli #397; tune #32) | | V Bc | 39: 284 | III/2.1: 162 | after BWV 299; → Z 3068; text by Crasselius | 00522 |
| 453 | 6. | 1735–1736 or earlier | song "Eins ist not! ach Herr, dies Eine" (Schemelli #112; tune #7) | | V Bc | 39: 284 | III/2.1: 116 | ↔ Z 7129; text by Schröder | 00523 |
| 454 | 6. | 1735–1736 or earlier | song "Ermuntre dich, mein schwacher Geist" (Schemelli #187; tune #12) | | V Bc | 39: 284 | III/2.1: 124 | after Z 5741; text by Rist | 00524 |
| 455 | 6. | 1735–1736 or earlier | song "Erwürgtes Lamm, das die verwahrten Siegel" (Schemelli #580; tune #43) | | V Bc | 39: 285 | III/2.1: 184 | after Z 3138; text by Bonin | 00525 |
| 456 | 6. | 1735–1736 or earlier | song "Es glänzet der Christen inwendiges Leben" (Schemelli #572; tune #40) | | V Bc | 39: 285 | III/2.1: 178 | after Z 6969; text by Richter | 00526 |
| 457 | 6. | 1735–1736 or earlier | song "Es ist nun aus mit meinem Leben" (Schemelli #847; tune #57) | | V Bc | 39: 286 | III/2.1: 212 | after Z 6969; text by Omeis | 00527 |
| 458 | 6. | 1735–1736 or earlier | song "Es ist vollbracht! Vergiss ja nicht dies Wort" (Schemelli #306; tune #25) | | V Bc | 39: 286 | III/2.1: 148 | after Z 2692; text by Schmidt | 00528 |
| 459 | 6. | 1735–1736 or earlier | song "Es kostet viel, ein Christ zu sein" (Schemelli #522; tune #38) | | V Bc | 39: 286 | III/2.1: 174 | after Z 2727; text by Richter | 00529 |
| 460 | 6. | 1735–1736 or earlier | song "Gib dich zufrieden und sei stille" (Schemelli #647; tune #45) | | V Bc | 39: 288 | III/2.1: 188 | after Z 7415; text by Gerhardt | 00530 |
| 461 | 6. | 1735–1736 or earlier | song "Gott lebet noch" (Schemelli #488; tune #37) | | V Bc | 39: 288 | III/2.1: 172 | after Z 7951; ↔ BWV 320; text by Zihn | 00531 |
| 462 | 6. | 1735–1736 or earlier | song "Gott wie groß ist deine Güte" (Schemelli #360; tune #30) | | V Bc | 39: 289 | III/2.1: 158 | text by Schemelli; → Z 7937 | 00532 |
| 463 | 6. | 1735–1736 or earlier | song "Herr, nicht schicke deine Rache" (Schemelli #78; tune #5) | | V Bc | 39: 289 | III/2.1: 112 | after Z 6863; text by Opitz | 00533 |
| 464 | 6. | 1735–1736 or earlier | song "Ich bin ja, Herr, in deiner Macht" (Schemelli #861; tune #58) | | V Bc | 39: 290 | III/2.1: 214 | after Z 5869a; text by Dach | 00534 |
| 465 | 6. | 1735–1736 or earlier | song "Ich freue mich in dir" (Schemelli #194; tune #13) | | V Bc | 39: 290 | III/2.1: 126 | after Z 5138; text by Ziegler, C. | 00535 |
| 466 | 6. | 1735–1736 or earlier | song "Ich halte treulich still" (Schemelli #657; tune #46) | | V Bc | 39: 290 | III/2.1: 190 | text by Till; → Z 5082 | 00536 |
| 467 | 6. | 1735–1736 or earlier | song "Ich lass dich nicht" (Schemelli #734; tune #51) | | V Bc | 39: 291 | III/2.1: 200 | after Z 7455; text by Deßler | 00537 |
| 468 | 6. | 1735–1736 or earlier | song "Ich liebe Jesum alle Stund" (Schemelli #737; tune #52) | | V Bc | 39: 291 | III/2.1: 202 | after Z 4731; → Z 4732 | 00538 |
| 469 | 6. | 1735–1736 or earlier | song "Ich steh an deiner Krippen hier" (Schemelli #195; tune #14) | | V Bc | 39: 292 | III/2.1: 128 | ↔ Z 4663; text by Gerhardt | 00539 |
| 476 | 6. | 1735–1736 or earlier | song "Ihr Gestirn, ihr hohlen Lüfte" (Schemelli #197; tune #15) | | V Bc | 39: 294 | III/2.1: 130 | after Z 3703; text by Franck, J. | 00546 |
| 471 | 6. | 1735–1736 or earlier | song "Jesu, deine Liebeswunden" (Schemelli #139; tune #10) | | V Bc | 39: 292 | III/2.1: 122 | text by Wegleit.?; → Z 1302 | 00541 |
| 470 | 6. | 1735–1736 or earlier | song "Jesu, Jesu, du bist mein" (Schemelli #741; tune #53) | | V Bc | 39: 292 | III/2.1: 204 | ↔ BWV 357; → Z 6446 | 00540 |
| 472 | 6. | 1735–1736 or earlier | song "Jesu, meines Glaubens Zier" (Schemelli #119; tune #8) | | V Bc | 39: 293 | III/2.1: 118 | after Z 6453; text by Sacer | 00542 |
| 473 | 6. | 1735–1736 or earlier | song "Jesu, meines Herzens Freud" (Schemelli #696; tune #48) | | V Bc | 39: 293 | III/2.1: 194 | after Z 4797–4798; text by Flittner | 00543 |
| 474 | 6. | 1735–1736 or earlier | song "Jesus ist das schönste Licht" (Schemelli #463; tune #33) | | V Bc | 39: 293 | III/2.1: 164 | after Z 6412; text by Richter | 00544 |
| 475 | 6. | 1735–1736 or earlier | song "Jesus, unser Trost und Leben" (Schemelli #333; tune #28) | | V Bc | 39: 294 | III/2.1: 154 | after Z 4918; text by Homburg | 00545 |
| 477 | 6. | 1735–1736 or earlier | song "Kein Stündlein geht dahin" (Schemelli #869; tune #60) | | V Bc | 39: 294 | III/2.1: 218 | after 4243b; text by Franck, M.? | 00547 |
| 478 | 6. | 1735–1736 or earlier | song "Komm, süßer Tod" (Schemelli #868; tune #59) | | V Bc | 39: 295 | III/2.1: 216 | → Z 4400 | 00548 |
| 479 | 6. | 1735–1736 or earlier | song "Kommt, Seelen, dieser Tag" (Schemelli #936; tune #67) | | V Bc | 39: 295 | III/2.1: 232 | → Z 5185; text by Löscher | 00549 |
| 480 | 6. | 1735–1736 or earlier | song "Kommt wieder aus der finstern Gruft" (Schemelli #938; tune #68) | | V Bc | 39: 296 | III/2.1: 234 | → Z 4709; text by Löscher | 00550 |
| 481 | 6. | 1735–1736 or earlier | song "Lasset uns mit Jesu ziehen" (Schemelli #281; tune #18) | | V Bc | 39: 296 | III/2.1: 136 | after Z 7886b; ↔ BWV 413; text by Birken | 00551 |
| 482 | 6. | 1735–1736 or earlier | song "Liebes Herz, bedenke doch" (Schemelli #467; tune #34) | | V Bc | 39: 297 | III/2.1: 166 | after Z 6434; text by Koitsch | 00552 |
| 483 | 6. | 1735–1736 or earlier | song "Liebster Gott, wann werd ich sterben" (Schemelli #873; tune #61) | E♭ maj. | V Bc | 39: 297 | III/2.1: 220 | after Z 6634; text by Neumann | 00553 |
| 484 | 6. | 1735–1736 or earlier | song "Liebster Herr Jesu, wo bleibst du so lange" (Schemelli #874; tune #62) | | V Bc | 39: 298 | III/2.1: 222 | ↔ Z 3969; text by Weselowius | 00554 |
| 485 | 6. | 1735–1736 or earlier | song "Liebster Immanuel, Herzog der Frommen" (Schemelli #761; tune #54) | | V Bc | 39: 298 | III/2.1: 206 | after Z 4932c; text by Fritsch | 00555 |
| 488 | 6. | 1735–1736 or earlier | song "Meines Lebens letzte Zeit" (Schemelli #881; tune #63) | | V Bc | 39: 299 | III/2.1: 224 | after Z 6380; ↔ BWV 381 | 00558 |
| 486 | 6. | 1735–1736 or earlier | song "Mein Jesu, dem die Seraphinen" (Schemelli #121; tune #9) | | V Bc | 39: 298 | III/2.1: 120 | after Z 5988; text by Deßler | 00556 |
| 487 | 6. | 1735–1736 or earlier | song "Mein Jesu! was vor Seelenweh" (Schemelli #283; tune #19) | | V Bc | 39: 299 | III/2.1: 138 | text by Schemelli?; → Z 8383 | 00557 |
| 489 | 6. | 1735–1736 or earlier | song "Nicht so traurig, nicht so sehr" (Schemelli #574; tune #41) | | V Bc | 39: 300 | III/2.1: 180 | after Z 3342; text by Gerhardt? | 00559 |
| 490 | 6. | 1735–1736 or earlier | song "Nur mein Jesus ist mein Leben" (Schemelli #700; tune #49) | | V Bc | 39: 300 | III/2.1: 196 | after Z 8404c | 00560 |
| 491 | 6. | 1735–1736 or earlier | song "O du Liebe meiner Liebe" (Schemelli #284; tune #20) | | V Bc | 39: 300 | III/2.1: 140 | after Z 6693; text by Senitz | 00561 |
| 492 | 6. | 1735–1736 or earlier | song "O finstre Nacht, wenn wirst du doch vergehen" (Schemelli #891; tune #64) | | V Bc | 39: 301 | III/2.1: 226 | ↔ Z 6171; text by Breithaupt | 00562 |
| 493 | 6. | 1735–1736 or earlier | song "O Jesulein süß, o Jesulein mild" (Schemelli #203; tune #16) | | V Bc | 39: 302 | III/2.1: 132 | after Z 2016a; text by Thilo | 00563 |
| 494 | 6. | 1735–1736 or earlier | song "O liebe Seele, zieh die Sinnen" (Schemelli #575; tune #42) | | V Bc | 39: 302 | III/2.1: 182 | → Z 7787 | 00564 |
| 495 | 6. | 1735–1736 or earlier | song "O wie selig seid ihr doch, ihr Frommen" (Schemelli #894; tune #65) | | V Bc | 39: 302 | III/2.1: 228 | after Z 1583; ↔ BWV 405; text by Dach | 00565 |
| 496 | 6. | 1735–1736 or earlier | song "Seelenbräutigam" (Schemelli #472; tune #35) | | V Bc | 39: 303 | III/2.1: 168 | after Z 3255a–b; ↔ BWV 409; text by Drese | 00566 |
| 497 | 6. | 1735–1736 or earlier | song "Seelenweide" (Schemelli #710; tune #50) | | V Bc | 39: 303 | III/2.1: 198 | after Z 1286; text by Drese | 00567 |
| 499 | 6. | 1735–1736 or earlier | song "Sei gegrüßet, Jesu gütig" (Schemelli #293; tune #22) | | V Bc | 39: 304 | III/2.1: 143 | after Z 3889b; ↔ BWV 410; text by Keymann | 00569 |
| 498 | 6. | 1735–1736 or earlier | song "Selig, wer an Jesum denkt" (Schemelli #292; tune #21) | | V Bc | 39: 304 | III/2.1: 142 | → Z 4846 | 00568 |
| 500 | 6. | 1735–1736 or earlier | song "So gehst du nun, mein Jesu hin" (Schemelli #296; tune #23) | | V Bc | 39: 304 | III/2.1: 144 | after Z 7631b; ↔ BWV 500a; text by Nachtenhöfer | 00570 |
| 501 | 6. | 1735–1736 or earlier | song "So gibst du nun, mein Jesu, gute Nacht" (Schemelli #315; tune #26) | | V Bc | 39: 304 | III/2.1: 150 | after Z 849; ↔ BWV 412; text by Pfeiffer | 00572 |
| 502 | 6. | 1735–1736 or earlier | song "So wünsch ich mir zu guter Letzt" (Schemelli #901; tune #66) | | V Bc | 39: 305 | III/2.1: 230 | ↔ Z 5892; text by Rist | 00573 |
| 503 | 6. | 1735–1736 or earlier | song "Steh ich bei meinem Gott" (Schemelli #945; tune #69) | | V Bc | 39: 305 | III/2.1: 236 | after Z 5207; text by Herrnschmidt | 00574 |
| 504 | 6. | 1735–1736 or earlier | song "Vergiss mein nicht, dass ich dein nicht vergesse" (Schemelli #475; tune #36) | | V Bc | 39: 306 | III/2.1: 170 | after Z 4779; text by Arnold | 00575 |
| 505 | 6. | 1735–1736 or earlier | song "Vergiss mein nicht, ..., Mein allerliebster Gott" (Schemelli #627; tune #44) | | V Bc | 39: 306 | III/2.1: 186 | text by Arnold; → Z 4233 | 00576 |
| 506 | 6. | 1735–1736 or earlier | song "Was bist du doch, o Seele, so betrübt" (Schemelli #779; tune #55) | A min. | V Bc | 39: 307 | III/2.1: 208 | after Z 1837; ↔ BWV 424; text by Schultt, R. F. | 00577 |
| 507 | 6. | 1735–1736 or earlier | song "Wo ist mein Schäflein, das ich liebe" (Schemelli #108; tune #6) | | V Bc | 39: 308 | III/2.1: 114 | after Z 5958a; text by Schultt, J. P. | 00578 |
| 508 | 6. | 1718-11-16 (GHS) after 1733–1734 (AMB) | Notebook A. M. Bach (1725) No. 25: aria "Bist du bei mir" | E♭ maj. | V Bc | 43^{2}: 36; 39: 309 | V/4: 102 | after Stölzel (Diomedes) | 00579 |
| 509 | 6. | 1725–1733 (AMB) | Notebook A. M. Bach (1725) No. 41: aria "Gedenke doch, mein Geist, zurücke" | | V Bc | 43^{2}: 52; 39: 310 | V/4: 128 | | 00580 |
| 510 | 6. | 1725–1733 | Notebook A. M. Bach (1725) No. 12: song "Gib dich zufrieden und sei stille" | F maj. | V Bc | 43^{2}: 30; 39: 311 | V/4: 91 | | 00581 |
| 511 | 6. | 1725–1733 | Notebook A. M. Bach (1725) No. 13a: song "Gib dich zufrieden und sei stille" | G min. | V Bc | 43^{2}: 31; 39: 287 | V/4: 91 | text by Gerhardt; → BWV 512 | 00582 |
| 512 | 6. | 1725–1733 | Notebook A. M. Bach (1725) No. 13b: song "Gib dich zufrieden und sei stille" | E min. | V Bc | 43^{2}: 31; 39: 287 | V/4: 91 | after BWV 511; ↔ BWV 315, Z 7417a; text by Gerhardt | 00583 |
| 513 | 6. | 1725–1733 (AMB) | Notebook A. M. Bach (1725) No. 42: song "O Ewigkeit, du Donnerwort" | | V Bc | 43^{2}: 52; 39: 301 | V/4: 129 | ↔ BWV 397; text by Rist | 00584 |
| 514 | 6. | 1725–1733 (AMB) | Notebook A. M. Bach (1725) No. 35: song "Schaffs mit mir, Gott" | | V Bc | 43^{2}: 48; 39: 303 | V/4: 125 | text by Schmolck | 00585 |
| 515 | 6. | after 1733–1734 | Notebook A. M. Bach (1725) No. 20a: aria "So oft ich meine Tobackspfeife" | D min. | V Bc | 43^{2}: 34 | V/4: 98 | by Bach, G. H.?; → BWV 515a | 00586 |
| 515a | 6. | after 1733–1734 | Notebook A. M. Bach (1725) No. 20b: aria "So oft ich meine Tobackspfeife" | G min. | V Bc | 43^{2}: 34; 39: 309 | V/4: 98 | after BWV 515 | 00587 |
| 516 | 6. | after 1733–1734 (AMB) | Notebook A. M. Bach (1725) No. 33: aria "Warum betrübst du dich" | | V Bc | 43^{2}: 46; 39: 307 | V/4: 121 | | 00588 |
| 517 | 6. | after 1733–1734 (AMB) | Notebook A. M. Bach (1725) No. 40: song "Wie wohl ist mir, o Freund der Seelen" | | V Bc | 43^{2}: 51; 39: 307 | V/4: 128 | text by Deßler | 00589 |
| 518 | 6. | after 1725 | Notebook A. M. Bach (1725) No. 37: aria "Willst du dein Herz mir schenken" a.k.a. "Aria di G(i)ovannini" | | V Bc | 43^{2}: 49; 39: 311 | V/4: 126 | | 00590 |
| 519 | 6. | c.1736? | Five Hymns from SBB Bach P 802 No. 1: "Hier lieg ich nun, o Vater aller Gnaden" | | V Bc | | | by Krebs, J. L.?; in Spitta III, pp. 401–403 | 00591 |
| 520 | 6. | c.1736? | Five Hymns from SBB Bach P 802 No. 2: "Das walt mein Gott, Gott Vater, Sohn und heilger Geist" | | V Bc | | | by Krebs, J. L.?; in Spitta III, pp. 401–403 | 00592 |
| 521 | 6. | c.1736? | Five Hymns from SBB Bach P 802 No. 3: "Gott, mein Herz dir Dank zusendet" | | V | | III/3 | by Krebs, J. L.?; in Spitta III, pp. 401–403 | 00593 |
| 522 | 6. | c.1736? | Five Hymns from SBB Bach P 802 No. 4: "Meine Seele, lass es gehen, wie es in der Welt jetzt geht" | | V | | | by Krebs, J. L.?; in Spitta III, pp. 401–403 | 00594 |
| 523 | 6. | c.1736? | Five Hymns from SBB Bach P 802 No. 5: "Ich gnüge mich an meinem Stande" | | V | | | by Krebs, J. L.?; in Spitta III, pp. 401–403 | 00595 |
| 524 | 6. | 1707 – July 1708 | Quodlibet (incomplete; wedding?) | | SATB (SBBB) Bc | NBG 32^{2} | I/41: 69 | | 00596 |

=== Sacred songs and arias from Schemelli's Songbook (BWV 439–507) ===
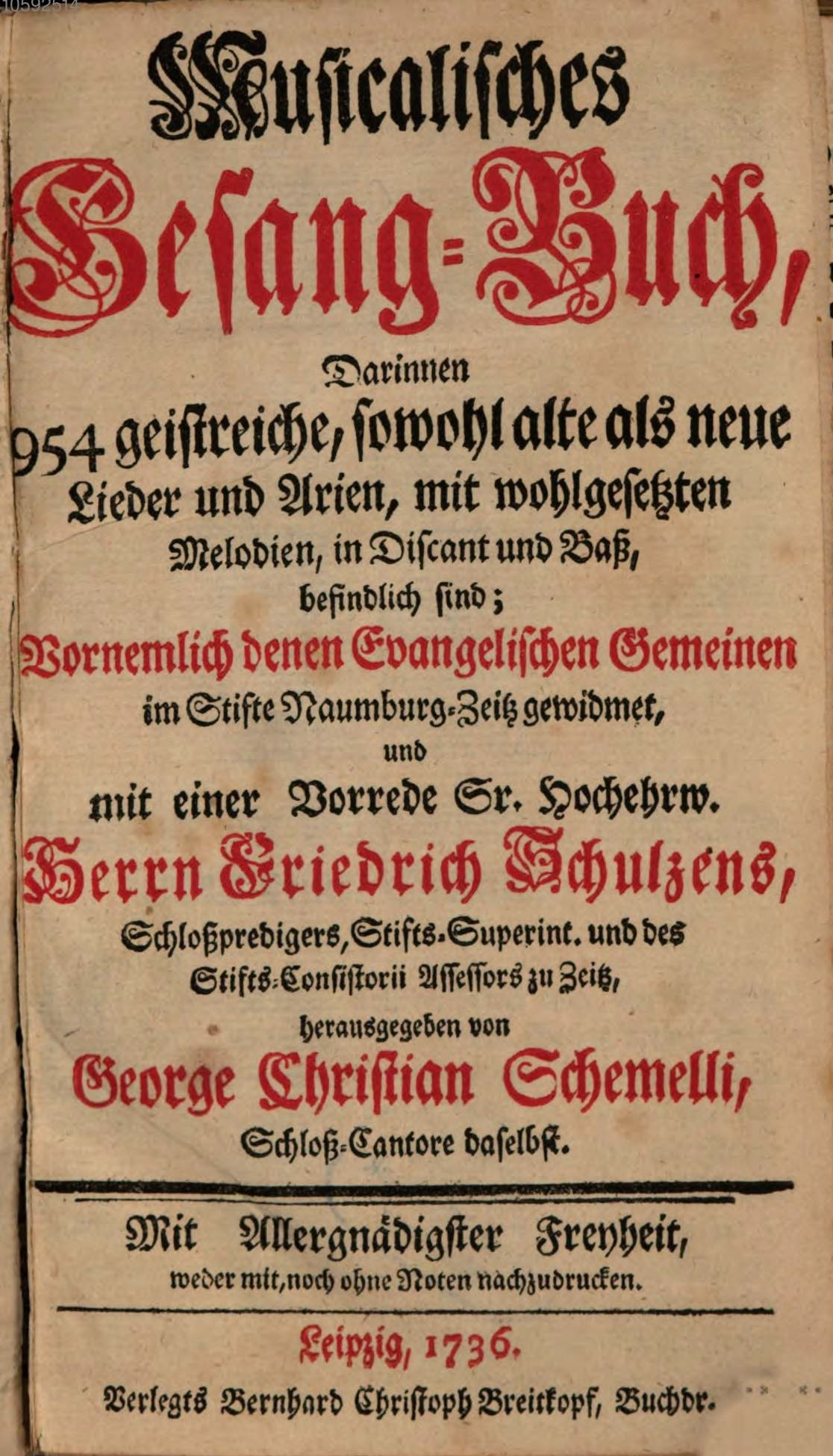
Title page of Georg Christian Schemelli's 1736 Songbook, containing 69 melodies for which Bach provided a melody and/or (improved) accompaniment

The hymnal or song book known as Schemellis Gesangbuch, published 1736 in Leipzig by Georg Christian Schemelli, contained 954 hymns; 69 of these, listed here, were accompanied by a melody and a figured bass.

- BWV 439 – Ach, dass nicht die letzte Stunde
- BWV 440 – Auf, auf! die rechte Zeit ist hier
- BWV 441 – Auf! auf! mein Herz, mit Freuden
- BWV 442 – Beglückter Stand getreuer Seelen
- BWV 443 – Beschränkt, ihr Weisen dieser Welt
- BWV 444 – Brich entzwei, mein armes Herze
- BWV 445 – Brunnquell aller Güter
- BWV 446 – Der lieben Sonnen Licht und Pracht
- BWV 447 – Der Tag ist hin, die Sonne gehet nieder
- BWV 448 – Der Tag mit seinem Lichte
- BWV 449 – Dich bet' ich an, mein höchster Gott
- BWV 450 – Die bittre Leidenszeit beginnet abermal
- BWV 451 – Die güldne Sonne voll Freud und Wonne
- BWV 452 – Dir, dir Jehovah, will ich singen
- BWV 453 – Eins ist Not! ach Herr, dies Eine
- BWV 454 – Ermuntre dich, mein schwacher Geist
- BWV 455 – Erwürgtes Lamm, das die verwahrten Siegel
- BWV 456 – Es glänzet der Christen
- BWV 457 – Es ist nun aus mit meinem Leben
- BWV 458 – Es ist vollbracht! vergiss ja nicht
- BWV 459 – Es kostet viel, ein Christ zu sein
- BWV 460 – Gib dich zufrieden und sei stille
- BWV 461 – Gott lebet noch; Seele, was verzagst du doch?
- BWV 462 – Gott, wie groß ist deine Güte
- BWV 463 – Herr, nicht schicke deine Rache
- BWV 464 – Ich bin ja, Herr, in deiner Macht
- BWV 465 – Ich freue mich in dir
- BWV 466 – Ich halte treulich still und liebe
- BWV 467 – Ich lass' dich nicht
- BWV 468 – Ich liebe Jesum alle Stund'
- BWV 469 – Ich steh' an deiner Krippen hier
- BWV 470 – Jesu, Jesu, du bist mein
- BWV 471 – Jesu, deine Liebeswunden
- BWV 472 – Jesu, meines Glaubens Zier
- BWV 473 – Jesu, meines Herzens Freud
- BWV 474 – Jesus ist das schönste Licht
- BWV 475 – Jesus, unser Trost und Leben
- BWV 476 – Ihr Gestirn', ihr hohen Lufte
- BWV 477 – Kein Stündlein geht dahin
- BWV 478 – Komm, süßer Tod, komm, selge Ruh
- BWV 479 – Kommt, Seelen, dieser Tag
- BWV 480 – Kommt wieder aus der finstern Gruft
- BWV 481 – Lasset uns mit Jesu ziehen
- BWV 482 – Liebes Herz, bedenke doch
- BWV 483 – Liebster Gott, wann werd' ich sterben?
- BWV 484 – Liebster Herr Jesu! wo bleibest du so lange?
- BWV 485 – Liebster Immanuel, Herzog der Frommen
- BWV 486 – Mein Jesu, dem die Seraphinen
- BWV 487 – Mein Jesu! was für Seelenweh
- BWV 488 – Meines Lebens letzte Zeit
- BWV 489 – Nicht so traurig, nicht so sehr
- BWV 490 – Nur mein Jesus ist mein Leben
- BWV 491 – O du Liebe meiner Liebe
- BWV 492 – O finstre Nacht
- BWV 493 – O Jesulein süß, o Jesulein mild
- BWV 494 – O liebe Seele, zieh' die Sinnen
- BWV 495 – O wie selig seid ihr doch, ihr Frommen
- BWV 496 – Seelen-Bräutigam, Jesu, Gottes Lamm
- BWV 497 – Seelenweide, meine Freude
- BWV 498 – Selig, wer an Jesum denkt
- BWV 499 – Sei gegrüßet, Jesu gütig
- BWV 500 – So gehst du nun, mein Jesu, hin
- BWV 501 – So giebst du nun, mein Jesu, gute Nacht
- BWV 502 – So wünsch' ich mir zu guter Letzt
- BWV 503 – Steh' ich bei meinem Gott
- BWV 504 – Vergiss mein nicht, dass ich dein nicht
- BWV 505 – Vergiss mein nicht, vergiss mein nicht
- BWV 506 – Was bist du doch, o Seele, so betrübet
- BWV 507 – Wo ist mein Schäflein, das ich liebe

=== Songs and arias from the second Notebook for Anna Magdalena Bach (BWV 508–518) ===
So oft ich meine Tobackspfeife, BWV 515 (4:49)
Ukrainian words by M. Strikha

- BWV 508 – Bist du bei mir (on a melody by Gottfried Heinrich Stölzel; doubtful)
- BWV 509 – Gedenke doch, mein Geist, aria
- BWV 510 – Gib dich zufrieden, chorale (doubtful)
- BWV 511 – Gib dich zufrieden, chorale
- BWV 512 – Gib dich zufrieden, chorale
- BWV 513 – O Ewigkeit, du Donnerwort, chorale
- BWV 514 – Schaffs mit mir, Gott, chorale
- BWV 515 – So oft ich meine Tobackspfeife, aria (doubtful)
- BWV 515a – So oft ich meine Tobackspfeife
- BWV 516 – Warum betrübst du dich, aria
- BWV 517 – Wie wohl ist mir, o Freund der Seelen
- BWV 518 – Willst du dein Herz mir schenken

=== Five hymns from a manuscript by Johann Ludwig Krebs (BWV 519–523) ===
Fünf geistliche Lieder are five hymns as collected by Johann Ludwig Krebs (1713–1780) and published by Breitkopf & Härtel in 1917.

- BWV 519 – Hier lieg ich nun (doubtful)
- BWV 520 – Das walt' mein Gott (doubtful)
- BWV 521 – Gott mein Herz dir Dank (doubtful)
- BWV 522 – Meine Seele, lass es gehen (doubtful)
- BWV 523 – Ich gnüge mich an meinem Stande (doubtful)

=== Quodlibet (BWV 524) ===
- BWV 524 – Wedding Quodlibet (fragment)

== Added to the BWV catalogue in the 21st century (BWV 1127) ==
- BWV 1127 – "Alles mit Gott und nichts ohn' ihn" (strophic aria composed in Weimar in 1713, rediscovered in 2005)

== Doubtful works from BWV Anh. II (BWV Anh. 32–41) ==
BWV Anh. II lists eight songs in Christian Hofmann von Hofmannswaldau's Deutsche Übersetzungen und Gedichte and two in Sperontes' Singende Muse an der Pleiße as possibly composed by Bach.

=== From Deutsche Übersetzungen und Gedichte ===
- BWV Anh. 32 – Sacred Song "Getrost mein Geist, wenn Wind und Wetter krachen" (doubtful)
- BWV Anh. 33 – Sacred song "Mein Jesus, spare nicht" (doubtful)
- BWV Anh. 34 – Sacred Song "Kann ich mit einem Tone" (doubtful)
- BWV Anh. 35 – Sacred Song "Meine Seele lass die Flügel" (doubtful)
- BWV Anh. 36 – Sacred song "Ich stimm' itzund ein Straff-Lied an" (doubtful)
- BWV Anh. 37 – Sacred song "Der schwarze Flügel trüber Nacht" (doubtful)
- BWV Anh. 38 – Sacred song "Das Finsterniß tritt ein" (doubtful)
- BWV Anh. 39 – Song "Ach was wollt ihr trüben Sinnen" (doubtful)

=== From Singende Muse an der Pleiße ===
- BWV Anh. 40 – Song "Ich bin nun wie ich bin" (Text lost; doubtful)
- BWV Anh. 41 – Song "Dir zu Liebe, wertes Herze" (doubtful)

== Spurious work from BWV Anh. III (BWV Anh. 158) ==
- BWV Anh. 158 – Aria "Andro dall' colle al prato", by Johann Christian Bach

== Other BWV numbers referring to a single aria ==
In the church cantata range of BWV numbers (BWV 1–200):

- BWV 53 – "Schlage doch, gewünschte Stunde" (probably spurious, by Melchior Hoffmann)
- BWV 200 – "Bekennen will ich seinen Namen" (based on an aria included in Ein Lämmlein geht und trägt die Schuld, a passion-oratorio by Gottfried Heinrich Stölzel)
