= Bist du bei mir =

Aria composed by Gottfried Heinrich Stölzel

"Bist du bei mir" (BWV 508)
Performed by soprano Elisabeth Schumann, 1934

"Bist du bei mir, geh ich mit Freuden" (If you are with me, I go with joy) is an aria from Gottfried Heinrich Stölzel's opera Diomedes, which was first staged on 16 November 1718. The aria is best known as "Bist du bei mir," BWV 508, a version for voice and continuo found as No. 25 in the 1725 Notebook for Anna Magdalena Bach.

== History ==
Gottfried Heinrich Stölzel's opera Diomedes was staged in Bayreuth in November 1718. There has been some speculation how one of its arias, "Bist du bei mir," came to be known in the Bach household in mid-1730s Leipzig, when Anna Magdalena Bach, Johann Sebastian's second wife, copied an arrangement of the aria into her second notebook. 21st-century scholarship has shown that from the 1720s to the mid-1730s, at least several dozen to perhaps over a hundred of Stölzel's compositions were adopted by Bach or his family members in their public and private music practices. Only indirect evidence suggests how such music was transferred from Stölzel to the Bachs; Bach and Stölzel were in the same places at different times, and shared acquaintances, but whether they met in person can only be surmised.

=== 1707–1732 ===
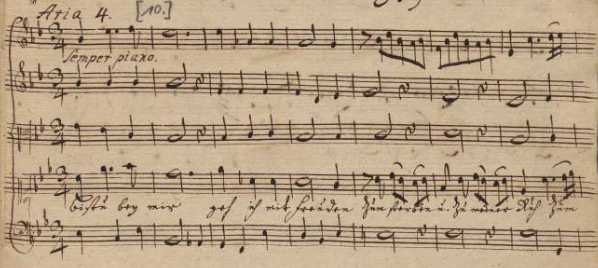
First system of the orchestral version of Stölzel's "Bist du bei mir", as copied around 1723.

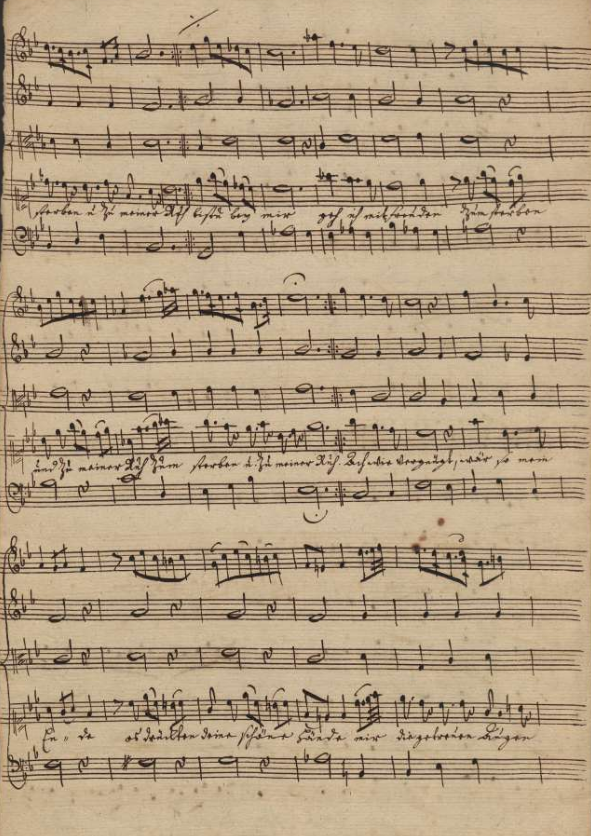
Orchestral version of Stölzel's "Bist du bei mir" (2nd to 4th system)

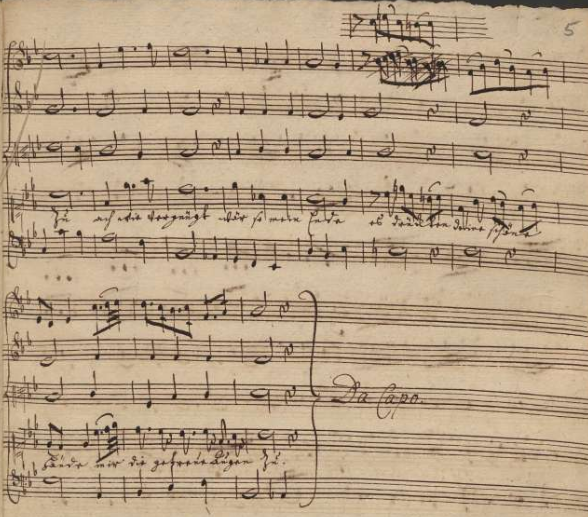
Orchestral version of Stölzel's "Bist du bei mir" (5th and 6th system)

From 1707 to 1710 Stölzel was a student at Leipzig University. At that time, Melchior Hoffmann was conductor of the Collegium Musicum founded by Telemann, which had Johann Georg Pisendel as its concert master. Hoffmann was director musices of the New Church (German: Neue Kirche), and his operas were performed in the Oper am Brühl when it reopened in 1708. Stölzel, eager to cultivate his interest in music, visited such venues of Leipzig's high-quality music life. Eventually he became an assistant of Hoffmann, initially as copyist, and later, shortly before leaving Leipzig, he saw his first compositions performed under Hoffmann's direction.

Bach visited the court at Gotha in 1711 and 1717. In 1711 he had been hired as performer on the organ, and during the second of these documented visits he performed his so-called Weimarer Passion during Holy Week. Stölzel moved to Bayreuth in 1717, where he was appointed to write church music for the second centenary of Reformation Day (31 October). For the 39th birthday of George William, Margrave of Brandenburg-Bayreuth (16 November) he composed a theatrical serenata, Der Liebe Sieges- und Friedes-Palmen. For the Margrave's next birthday he wrote Diomedes oder die triumphierende Unschuld (transl. Diomedes or the triumphant innocence), a large-scale opera which was staged on 16 November 1718. Before moving to Gotha the next year, where he would remain for the rest of his life, Stölzel still composed one further birthday serenata for the Margrave in Bayreuth.

In 1720, three years before he became Thomaskantor in Leipzig, Johann Sebastian Bach started the Klavierbüchlein (keyboard-booklet) for his eldest son Wilhelm Friedemann. Some years later Wilhelm Friedemann copied a four-movement keyboard suite by Stölzel in this notebook, to which his father added a trio (BWV 929). In 1725 Johann Sebastian started the second notebook for his second wife Anna Magdalena. In the meantime he had assumed his position of cantor and music director in Leipzig: among many responsibilities that came with that title, he was now in charge of the music in the New Church. From 1729 he also became director of the Collegium Musicum founded by Telemann.

Meanwhile, in Gotha, Stölzel had presented his first Passion oratorio, Ein Lämmlein geht und trägt die Schuld, in Holy Week of 1720, and composed a new cantata cycle every few years, among which:

- in the early 1720s a setting of Benjamin Schmolck's String-Music (Saitenspiel) cantata libretto cycle.
- for the 1731–32 liturgical year, a setting of Schmolck's Namebook (Namenbuch) cantata libretto cycle.

=== 1733–1754 ===
When Augustus the Strong died on 1 February 1733, a period of mourning was declared in his realm, which included Saxony. During this period, lasting from Sexagesima Sunday (15 February) to the fourth Sunday after Trinity (28 June), no concerted music was to be performed in church services. Johann Sebastian Bach used the period to compose his Mass for the Dresden court. He may have had the musicians of the Dresden court orchestra in mind when composing this extended setting: one of these musicians was its then-time concert master Pisendel, with whom Bach had been acquainted since before Stölzel had known him as concert master of Hoffmann's orchestra.

Early July 1733, Bach was still completing the composition, and the performance parts he intended to send to Dresden. Around this time, there are the earliest documented signs he used cantatas composed by Stölzel for performance in Leipzig. He may have performed two cantatas from Stölzel's Namebook cycle, for the fifth and sixth Sunday after Trinity, in July 1733: his copies of these cantatas date from around this time. He performed Stölzel's Ein Lämmlein geht und trägt die Schuld on Good Friday 23 April 1734, and likely Stölzel's entire String-Music cantata cycle from 1735 to 1736. Around the same time, that is, likely somewhere between 1734 and 1740, Anna Magdalena Bach entered a version for voice and continuo of "Bist du bei mir", an aria from Stölzel's 1718 Diomedes opera, in her second notebook.

That was not the end of Bach's dealings with Stölzel's music: in the early 1740s he reworked an aria from Stölzel's Ein Lämmlein geht und trägt die Schuld, "Dein Kreuz, o! Bräut’gam meiner Seelen" to Bekennen will ich seinen Namen, BWV 200. Stölzel's acquiring music composed by Bach is documented in 1747, when he bought a copy of Bach's Musical Offering for Gotha, less than a month after its publication. Both Stölzel and Bach joined Lorenz Christoph Mizler's exclusive Society of Musical Sciences: Stölzel in 1739, and Bach in 1747. After they died, Stölzel in 1749 and Bach in 1750, their obituaries were published in 1754, in the same issue of the Society's organ, the Musikalische Bibliothek.

== Text and music ==
In its 18th-century manuscripts "Bist du bei mir" is a da capo aria for soprano in E-flat major, in 3/4 time. Its lyrics also survive in the printed libretto of Stölzel's Diomedes opera:

Bist du bei mir, geh ich mit Freuden
zum Sterben und zu meiner Ruh.
Ach, wie vergnügt wär so mein Ende,
es drückten deine schönen Hände
mir die getreuen Augen zu.

— Lyrics of "Bist du bei mir" at Bach Digital.
Translation:

If you are with me, then I will go gladly
unto [my] death and to my rest.
Ah, how pleasing were my end,
if your dear hands then
shut my faithful eyes!

— Translation

Translations of the aria's text have been published, for instance, by Novello and by Alfred Music, and at The LiederNet Archive.

=== Stölzel's Diomedes ===
Two sources from the first quarter of the 18th century document text and music of Stölzel's Diomedes opera:

- A libretto printed for the first performance of the opera (16 November 1718 in Bayreuth).
- A manuscript copy, dated to c. 1723, containing an orchestral score of five arias by Stölzel, the only known extant music of the opera.

The libretto specifies the performance venue as "auf dem großen Theatro" (transl. at the grand theatre), where only some of the more remarkable Bayreuth theatrical productions of the time were staged. The libretto names no composer. In his autobiography, Stölzel describes the opera as "von meiner Arbeit" (transl. "made by me"). Also the 1720s manuscript copy of five arias mentions him as composer. Stölzel often wrote his own librettos. As far as known, the opera is his most extended composition: it contains over seventy arias, eight duets and six choruses, totalling over hundred movements.

The 1720s manuscript with the five arias does not name the instruments for which it is scored: these are assumed to be strings, that is violins (vl), viola (va) and basso continuo (bc). The soprano clef for the singer indicates a soprano voice for all arias. They are in different keys, and all of them are da capo arias. The fourth aria, that is "Bist du bei mir", is in E-flat major (although notated with only two flats at the clef), and has the most extended instrumentation: first violin (vl1), second violin (vl2), viola and continuo. It is also the only aria with a dynamics indicator: semper piano (soft throughout). Apart from the second aria, which seems to be an addition to the 7th scene of the 3rd act, all texts of the five arias score correspond with passages of the libretto of 1718, thus the lyrics of these arias can be coupled with the characters of the dramatis personae of the opera.

Extant arias of Stölzel's Diomedes
#	text incipit	character	scene	signature	instruments
1.	Es ist die Ursach' meines Leidens	Diomedes	Act II, sc. 11	F major; 3/4	vl va bc
2.	Geht ihr Küsse geht ihr Blicke	Mosthenes	Act III, sc. 7	G major; 3/8	vl bc
3.	Mein Glücke steht in deinen Händen	Copele	Act II, sc. 6	A major; 3/4	vl va bc
4.	Bist du bei mir geh ich mit Freuden	Diomedes	Act III, sc. 8	E♭ major; 3/4	vl1 vl2 va bc
5.	Sage mir doch wertes Glücke	Desania	Act I, sc. 5	A minor; 3/8	vl va bc

=== Anna Magdalena Bach's Notenbüchlein ===
Anna Magdalena Wilcke was an accomplished vocalist when she married Johann Sebastian Bach in 1721, around which time she was hired as a singer by his employer at Köthen. A year later, her first notebook was started: it contains, as far as extant, only keyboard music, most of it written down by Johann Sebastian. The first entries in her second notebook were, like the first entries in Wilhelm Friedemann's 1720 notebook, keyboard compositions by Johann Sebastian, written down by the composer. In the 1725 notebook these are followed by around ten short keyboard pieces by various composers, among which Christian Petzold's Minuet in G major (BWV Anh. 114), written down by Anna Magdalena without composer indication. The next pieces, BWV 510–512, are the first compositions for singing that appear in Anna Magdalena's notebooks.

The pieces in Anna Magdalena's 1725 notebook were written down by eight different scribes, that is, apart from Johann Sebastian and Anna Magdalena, Carl Philipp Emanuel (the second son from Johann Sebastian's first marriage), two sons of Johann Sebastian and Anna Magdalena (Johann Christoph Friedrich and Johann Christian), Bernhard Dietrich Ludewig (known to have worked as a copyist of some choral works for Bach), and two further writers who have not been identified. Pieces were entered intermittently over a long period of time (e.g., Johann Christian was born in 1735), and their sequence in the manuscript does not reflect the chronology of when they were entered. The "Menuet fait par Mons. Böhm" (No. 21, entered by Johann Sebastian) is the only piece that is attributed to another composer in the manuscript.

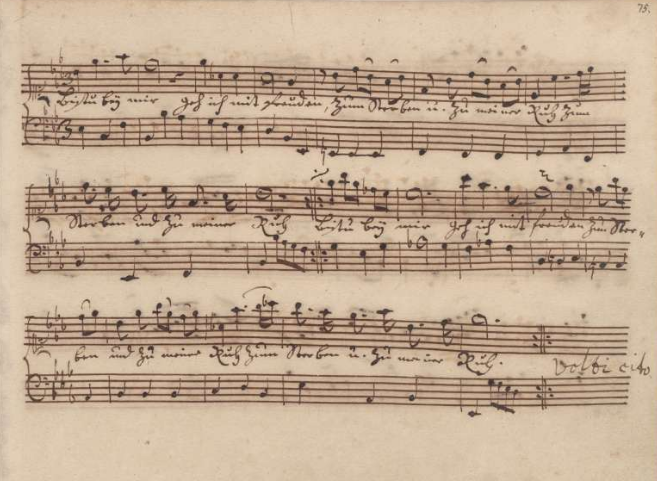
First page of "Bist du bei mir", BWV 508, as written down by Anna Magdalena Bach.

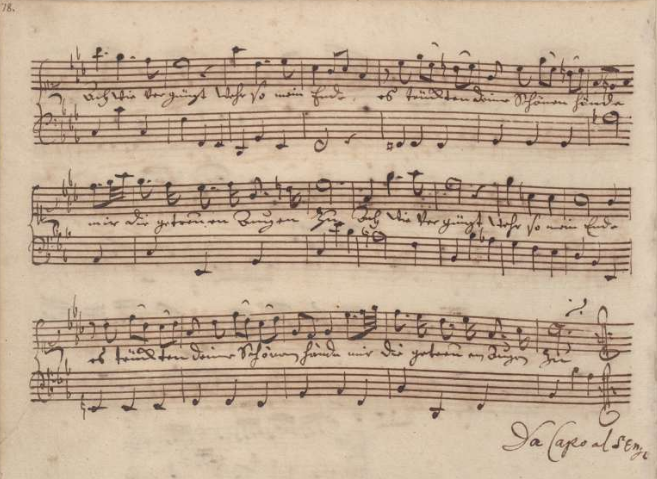
Second page of "Bist du bei mir", BWV 508, as written down by Anna Magdalena Bach.

Two objectives are apparent in Anna Magdalena's second notebook:

- it was used for instruction such as the musical education of Bach's younger sons, comparable to how Wilhelm Friedemann's Klavierbüchlein was in part used for the musical education of his eldest son.
- it contained Hausmusik (lit. 'home-music'), that is music to be performed in the family circle, such as most of the pieces that are still extant in Anna Magdalena's first notebook.

No. 25, "Bist du bei mir", BWV 508, belongs to the second category, along with another dozen pieces of vocal music in the 1725 notebook. Most of these other vocal compositions (BWV 509–518, 299 and 82/2–3) can, according to the 1998 edition of the Bach-Werke-Verzeichnis (BWV), be attributed to Johann Sebastian. Doubts about this attribution have however arisen regarding following arias and sacred songs:

- No. 12: "Gib dich zufrieden und sei stille" (BWV 510)
- No. 20: "So oft ich meine Tobackspfeife" (BWV 515) is possibly by Bach's son Gottfried Heinrich according to the 1998 edition of the BWV, but only attributed to the father at the Bach Digital website.
- No. 37: "Willst du dein Herz mir schenken" a.k.a. "Aria di G[i]ovannini" (BWV 518)
- No. 40: "Wie wohl ist mir, o Freund der Seelen" (BWV 517)
- No. 41: "Gedenke doch, mein Geist, zurücke" (BWV 509)

For many keyboard pieces that were unattributed in Anna Magdalena's 1725 Notenbüchlein, doubts about authorship had been around for a longer time: twenty such pieces, BWV Anh. 113–132, had been listed in the second Anhang, that is the Anhang of doubtful compositions, since the 1950 first edition of the BWV catalogue. Apart from "Bist du bei mir", all compositions from the three notebooks (Wilhelm Friedemann's Klavierbüchlein and both of Anna Magdalena's notebooks) that have been positively identified as being originally composed by another composer than Bach are keyboard pieces.

In the notebook "Bist du bei mir" is entered on two non-consecutive pages: the first half of the aria is on page 75, and the second half is on page 78: in between, No. 26 on pages 76–77, is Anna Magdalena's copy of the aria of the Goldberg Variations. That copy of BWV 988/1 was written down no earlier than 1733–34, possibly even only in the 1740s. There are various possibilities as to how the Diomedes aria became known in the Bach household, including, according to Andreas Glöckner, from scores that once belonged to the Oper am Brühl (which had bankrupted in 1720), or that "Bist du bei mir" simply was a well-known ditty in Leipzig in the second quarter of the 18th century, which Anna Magdalena thought would make a welcome addition to her Hausmusik collection.

Like in the five arias manuscript, the "Bist du bei mir" version in Anna Magdalena's notebook is in E-flat major, and uses a soprano clef for the singing voice. A difference in the notation is, however, that Anna Magdalena's manuscript uses three flats at the clef, which is the usual key signature for a composition in that key. Anna Magdalena likely copied her version from a score that used two flats at the clef. Apart from one measure in the second half of the composition, the melody for the singing voice is identical in both manuscripts. The continuo part of the BWV 508 version of "Bist du bei mir" is more lively and continuous in its voice leading than that of the extant orchestral version of the aria. The characteristics of the BWV 508 version (and of its extant manuscript), do not prove that Anna Magdalena's husband was the arranger of that version.

== Reception ==
=== 1860s–1940s ===
In 1866, a year after he had published his two-volume biography of Johann Sebastian Bach, Carl Hermann Bitter published six songs from Anna Magdalena's second Notenbüchlein, including "Bist du bei mir". Ernst Naumann published the aria separately in 1890, with a keyboard realisation of the accompaniment of his own hand. The Bach Gesellschaft published "Bist du bei mir" twice, both in the voice and continuo version as found in Anna Magdalena's notebook:

- edited by Franz Wüllner, in Vol. 39 (1892) of the Bach-Gesellschaft Ausgabe (BGA). In his preface, the editor names "Bist du bei mir" as one of the most beautiful songs he knows, and attributes it without doubt to Bach.
- edited by Paul Waldersee, in Vol. 43^{2} (1894) of the BGA. This editor is a bit more cautious when attributing the piece to Bach ("... könnte ... wohl eine Composition Johann Sebastian's sein" – transl. "... could ... well be a composition by Johann Sebastian"), while thinking it odd that the lyrics, which rather seem to be spoken by a male character, would be assigned to a female voice.

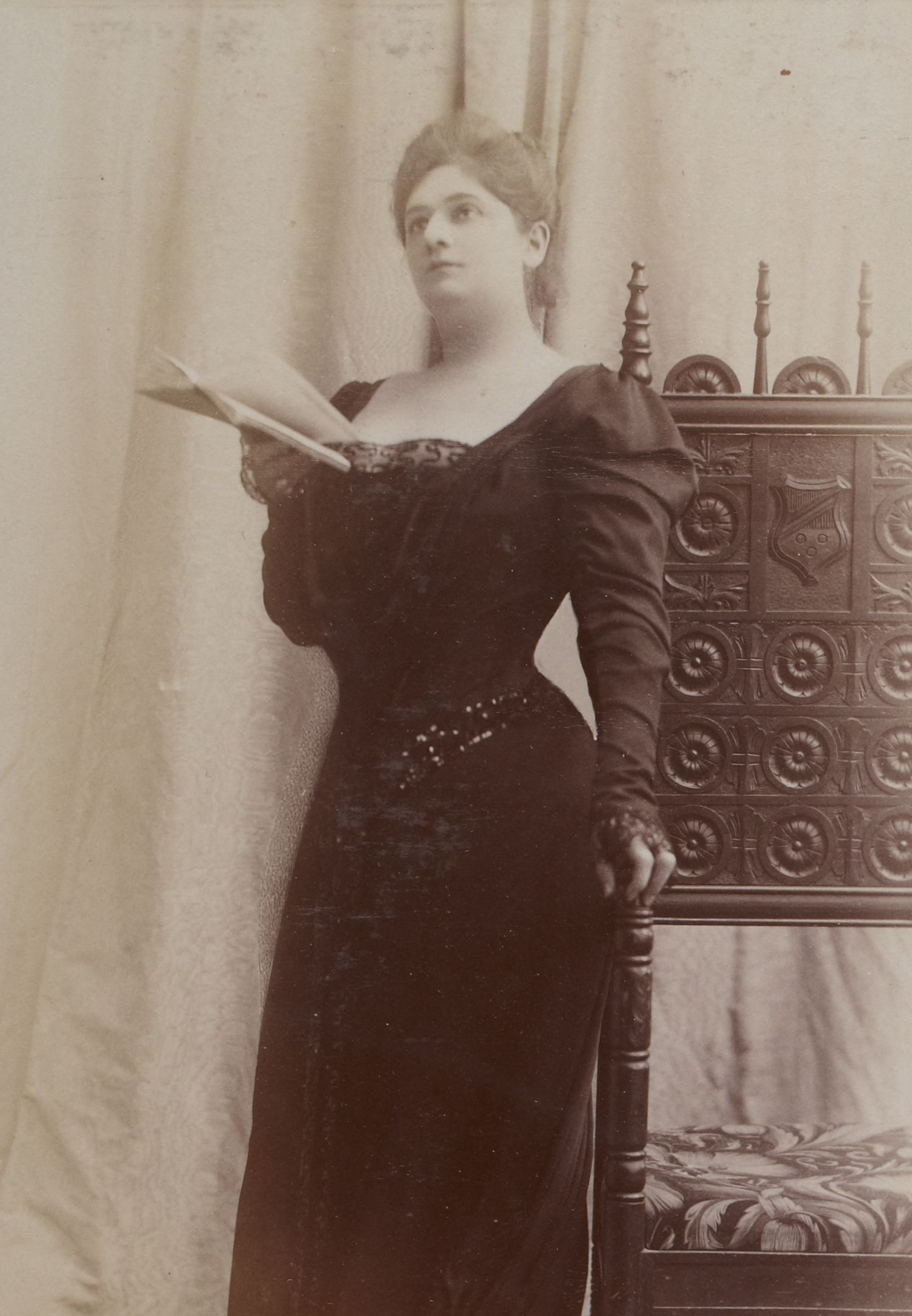
Blanche Marchesi recorded "Bist du bei mir" in 1906.

Also in 1894, Novello published Three Songs from Anna-Magdalena Bach's Notebooks, among which "Bist du bei mir", with an English translation. A story about Bach's family life, published in the same year for a youthful audience, describes the aria as especially captivating among the songs and dances of the notebooks. After the publication of several anthologies, all the pieces of the second notebook were published in a single volume in 1904. "Bist du bei mir" was recorded in 1906, sung by Blanche Marchesi.

Around 1915 Max Schneider discovered the orchestral version of "Bist du bei mir", along with four other arias by Stölzel, in an 18th-century manuscript at the library of the Sing-Akademie zu Berlin. At the time, this source was not further explored. In the 1920s the aria appeared in fictionalised biographical accounts:

- A 1924 story by Kurt Arnold Findeisen depicts Anna Magdalena starting to sing the aria when her husband returns home with the news that the Saxon Electress has died (1727).
- Esther Meynell's The Little Chronicle of Magdalena Bach (1925) pictures Anna Magdalena as overcome with emotion when she attempts to sing the aria.

Lotte Lehmann recorded "Bist du bei mir" in 1929. Singers who recorded the aria in the 1930s include Elisabeth Schumann, Paula Salomon-Lindberg and Jo Vincent. Richard Crooks sang "If Thou Be Near", an English-language version of the aria, on a recording that was released in 1938. Another English-language version, "Be Thou with me", was sung by Isobel Baillie on a war-time recording. During the Second World War, the archive of the Berlin Sing-Akademie went lost. Otto Klemperer's orchestral version of the aria was recorded in the 1940s.

=== 1950s and later ===
In 1950 Wolfgang Schmieder listed "Bist du bei mir" as a composition by Bach in the first edition of the Bach-Werke-Verzeichnis, assigning it the number 508 in that catalogue. In 1957 the aria was published in the New Bach Edition, where its editor, Georg von Dadelsen, mentioned the lost orchestral version in the Critical Commentary volume. The 1998 edition of the Bach-Werke-Verzeichnis kept "Bist du bei mir" in the main catalogue (i.e. without moving it to the Anhang either of the doubtful or of the spurious works), but mentions it was based on a setting by Stölzel in an inaccessible source.

Recordings of the aria from the second half of the 20th century include Elisabeth Schwarzkopf's 1954 recording at Abbey Road Studios with pianist Gerald Moore,

In 1999 the lost archive of the Sing-Akademie zu Berlin was recovered in Kyiv. Nonetheless, the manuscript with the five Stölzel arias was still considered lost as late as 2006. That same year the manuscript was however described in a publication by the Bach Archive, edited by Wolfram Enßlin. In 2009 a full catalogue of the Sing-Akademie's archive was published, in which the manuscript containing the five arias by Stölzel is indicated as SA 808. By this time "Bist du bei mir" and the four other arias of the SA 808 manuscript were identified as belonging to Stölzel's opera Diomedes. The archive of the Sing-Akademie was transmitted to the Berlin State Library, which made a facsimile of the manuscript containing the Diomedes arias available on their website.

"Bist du bei mir" has become a very popular choice for wedding ceremonies and other such occasions. The question whether the perception and popularity of the piece would have been affected if it would have been identified as Stölzel's in an earlier stage remains unanswered.

21st-century recordings of "Bist du bei mir" include:

- A recording by Natalie Dessay and Rolando Villazón, with an accompaniment for piano, violins, and cello arranged by Philippe Rombi, for the 2005 film Joyeux Noël.
- A recording by Amira Willighagen on her second album, Merry Christmas (2015), at eleven years of age.
- Hayley Westenra added it to the UK release of her third album Treasure in 2007 (Treasure became Westenra's fourth album in New Zealand)

== Sources ==
- "1. Klavierbüchlein der A. M. Bach, 1722 (D-B Mus.ms. Bach P 224)". Bach Digital. Leipzig: Bach Archive; et al. 22 January 2020.
- "2. Notenbüchlein der A. M. Bach, 1725 (D-B Mus. ms. Bach P 225)". Bach Digital. Leipzig: Bach Archive; et al. 13 January 2020.
- Ahrens, Christian (2007). "Neue Quellen zu J. S. Bachs Beziehungen nach Gotha" [New sources regarding J. S. Bach's interaction with Gotha]. In Wollny, Peter (ed.). Bach-Jahrbuch 2007 [Bach Yearbook 2007]. Bach-Jahrbuch (in German). Vol. 93. Neue Bachgesellschaft. Leipzig: Evangelische Verlagsanstalt. pp. 45–60. doi:10.13141/bjb.v2007. ISBN 978-3-374-02579-4. ISSN 0084-7682.
- Barry, Charles Ainslie, ed. (1894). Three Songs from Anna-Magdalena Bach's Notebooks. Translated by Hernaman, C. F. Novello & Co. OCLC 1061635218.
- Batka, Richard [in German], ed. (1904). Johann Sebastian Bachs Notenbüchlein für Anna Magdalena Bach (1725) [Johann Sebastian Bach's note-booklet for Anna Magdalena Bach (1725)] (in German). Munich: Callwey.
- Berkahn, Jonathan (2006). Wrestling with the German Devil: Five Case Studies in Fugue After J.S. Bach (Thesis). Victoria University of Wellington. hdl:10063/1038.
- Bitter, Carl Hermann, ed. (1866). Sechs deutsche Lieder von Joh. Seb. Bach [Six German Songs by Joh. Seb. Bach] (in German). Lachner, Vincenz (realisation of piano accompaniment). Berlin: Bote & G. Bock.
- Dürr, Alfred; Kobayashi, Yoshitake; Beißwenger, Kirsten, eds. (1998). Bach Werke Verzeichnis: Kleine Ausgabe – Nach der von Wolfgang Schmieder vorgelegten 2. Ausgabe [Bach Works Catalogue: Small Edition – After Wolfgang Schmieder's 2nd edition] (in German and English) (BWV^{2a} ed.). Wiesbaden: Breitkopf & Härtel. ISBN 9783765102493.
- Ezust, Emily, ed. (16 June 2014). "Bist du bei mir". The LiederNet Archive.
- Glöckner, Andreas; Leisinger, Ulrich; Schulze, Hans-Joachim; Wolff, Christoph; Wollny, Peter (2002). "Zurück in Berlin: Das Notenarchiv der Sing-Akademie – Bericht über eine erste Bestandsaufname"; (CW, pp. 167–169:) "Originale Ripienstimmen zu BWV 23"; (HJS, pp. 169–172:) "Amore traditore – Zur Herkunft eines umstrittenen Kantatentextes"; (AG, pp. 172–174:) "Neues zum Thema Bach und die Oper seiner Zeit"; (PW, pp. 175–178:) "Die Autographe Wilhelm Friedemann Bachs" ["Back in Berlin: the music archive of the Sing-Akademie – Notice about a first record of items"; (CW, pp. 167–169:) "Original ripieno-voices of BWV 23"; (HJS, pp. 169–172:) "Amore traditore – About the provenance of a debated cantata text"; (AG, pp. 172–174:) "News on the topic of Bach and the operas of his time"; (PW, pp. 175–178:) "The autographs of Wilhelm Friedemann Bach"]. In Schulze, Hans-Joachim; Wolff, Christoph (eds.). Bach-Jahrbuch 2002 [Bach Yearbook 2002]. Bach-Jahrbuch (in German). Vol. 88. Neue Bachgesellschaft. Leipzig: Evangelische Verlagsanstalt. pp. 165–180. doi:10.13141/bjb.v2002. ISBN 3-374-02031-3. ISSN 0084-7682.
- Glöckner, Andreas (2009). "Ein weiterer Kantatenjahrgang Gottfried Heinrich Stölzels in Bachs Aufführungsrepertoire?" [Is there another cantata cycle by Gottfried Heinrich Stölzel that belonged to Bach's performance repertoire?]. In Wollny, Peter (ed.). Bach-Jahrbuch 2009 [Bach Yearbook 2009]. Bach-Jahrbuch (in German). Vol. 95. Neue Bachgesellschaft. Leipzig: Evangelische Verlagsanstalt. pp. 95–115. doi:10.13141/bjb.v2009. ISBN 978-3-374-02749-1. ISSN 0084-7682.
- Hegen, Irene (2018). "Die markgräfliche Hofkapelle zu Bayreuth (1661–1769)". In Leopold, Silke; Pelker, Bärbel (eds.). Süddeutsche Hofkapellen im 18. Jahrhundert: Eine Bestandsaufnahme (in German). Books on Demand. pp. 1–54. ISBN 9783946054788.
- "Gesänge für eine Singstimme mit Pianoforte" [Songs for one singing voice and pianoforte]. Musikalisch-literarischer Monatsbericht (in German). 62 (8). Leipzig: Friedrich Hofmeister: 340–348. 1890.
- "Klavierbüchlein für W. F. Bach (US-NHub Music Deposit)". Bach Digital. Leipzig: Bach Archive; et al. 20 November 2018.
- Mizler, Lorenz Christoph, ed. (1754). "VI. Denkmal dreyer verstorbenen Mitglieder der Societät der musikalischen Wissenschafften", including: (Stölzel's obituary, pp. 143–157:) "B.", and (Bach's obituary, pp. 158–176:) "C". Musikalische Bibliothek (in German). IV (1). Leipzig: Mizlerischer Bücherverlag: 129–176.
- Naumann, Ernst, ed. (1890). Joh. Seb. Bach: "Bist du bei mir" (Aus dem grössern Klavierbüchlein f. A. Magd. Bach) [Joh. Seb. Bach: "Bist du bei mir" (from the larger keyboard booklet f. A. Magd. Bach]. Liederkreis: Sammlung vorzüglicher Lieder und Gesänge für eine Stimme mit Begleitung des Pianoforte (in German). Vol. 3. Leipzig: Breitkopf & Härtel. 271.
- Palmer, Willard A., ed. (1992). "Song Texts". Selections from Anna Magdalena's Notebook (2nd ed.). Alfred Music. pp. 46ff. ISBN 9781457442704.
- Pfau, Marc-Roderich (2008). "Ein unbekanntes Leipziger Kantatentextheft aus dem Jahr 1735: Neues zum Thema Bach und Stölzel" [An unknown Leipzig cantata text publication from the year 1735: News regarding Bach and Stölzel]. In Wollny, Peter (ed.). Bach-Jahrbuch 2008 [Bach Yearbook 2008]. Bach-Jahrbuch (in German). Vol. 94. Neue Bachgesellschaft. Leipzig: Evangelische Verlagsanstalt. pp. 99–122. doi:10.13141/bjb.v2008. ISBN 978-3-374-02668-5. ISSN 0084-7682.
- Potter, John (2017). "Beggar at the Door: The Rise and Fall of Portamento in Singing". In Milsom, David (ed.). Classical and Romantic Music. Routledge. pp. 401–428. ISBN 9781351571753.
- Schabalina, Tatjana (2008). "Texte zur Music in Sankt Petersburg: Neue Quellen zur Leipziger Musikgeschichte sowie zur Kompositions- und Aufführungstätigkeit Johann Sebastian Bachs" [Texte zur Music in Saint Petersburg: New sources on Leipzig's music history, including on Johann Sebastian Bach's compositional and performatory practices]. In Wollny, Peter (ed.). Bach-Jahrbuch 2008 [Bach Yearbook 2008]. Bach-Jahrbuch (in German). Vol. 94. Neue Bachgesellschaft. Leipzig: Evangelische Verlagsanstalt. pp. 33–98. doi:10.13141/bjb.v2008. ISBN 978-3-374-02668-5. ISSN 0084-7682.
- Stockigt, Janice B. (2013). "Bach's Missa BWV 232^{I} in the context of Catholic Mass settings in Dresden, 1729–1733". In Tomita, Yo; Leaver, Robin A.; Smaczny, Jan (eds.). Exploring Bach's B-minor Mass. Cambridge University Press. pp. 39–53. ISBN 978-1-107-00790-1.
- Stölzel, Gottfried Heinrich (1740). "Melch. Hofmann" and "Stöltzel" ["Melch. Hoffmann" and "Stölzel"]. In Mattheson, Johann (ed.). Grundlage einer Ehren-Pforte (in German). Hamburg: Mattheson. pp. 117–119 and 342–347.
- Tomita, Yo [in French], ed. (30 December 2018). "Author: Bitter, Carl Hermann (chronological table)". Bach Bibliography. Queen's University Belfast.
- Waldersee, Paul [in German], ed. (1894). Musikstücke in den Notenbüchern der Anna Magdalena Bach [Musical pieces in the notebooks of Anna Magdalena Bach]. Bach-Gesellschaft Ausgabe (in German). Vol. 43. Leipzig: Breitkopf & Härtel.
- Wolff, Christoph (2002). Johann Sebastian Bach: The Learned Musician (paperback ed.). Oxford University Press. ISBN 0199248842.
- Wollny, Peter (2008). "Bekennen will ich seinen Namen: Authentizität, Bestimmung und Kontext der Arie BWV 200. Anmerkungen zu Johann Sebastian Bachs Rezeption von Werken Gottfried Heinrich Stölzels" [Bekennen will ich seinen Namen: authenticity, purpose and context of the aria BWV 200. Annotations regarding Johann Sebastian Bach's reception of Gottfried Heinrich Stölzel's works]. Bach-Jahrbuch 2008 [Bach Yearbook 2008]. Bach-Jahrbuch (in German). Vol. 94. Neue Bachgesellschaft. Leipzig: Evangelische Verlagsanstalt. pp. 123–158. doi:10.13141/bjb.v2008. ISBN 978-3-374-02668-5. ISSN 0084-7682.
- Wüllner, Franz, ed. (1892). Motetten, Choräle und Lieder [Motets, chorales and songs]. Bach-Gesellschaft Ausgabe (in German). Vol. 39. Leipzig: Breitkopf & Härtel.
- Yearsley, David (2019). Sex, Death, and Minuets: Anna Magdalena Bach and Her Musical Notebooks. University of Chicago Press. ISBN 9780226617848.
