= Dir, dir, Jehova, will ich singen =

Christian hymn

- Christian hymn
- English: "Jehovah, let me now adore Thee"
- Catalogue: Zahn 3068
- Text: by Bartholomäus Crasselius
- Language: German
- Melody: from Hamburg (1690); attributed to Johann Sebastian Bach (1725)
- Published: 1695

"Dir, dir, Jehova, will ich singen" (To you, to you, Jehova, I want to sing) is a Lutheran hymn, with 1695 text by Bartholomäus Crasselius. A melody attributed to Johann Sebastian Bach appeared in Schemellis Gesangbuch. It was translated into English by Catherine Winkworth in 1863 as "Jehovah, let me now adore Thee". The song became part of many German hymnals, such as Evangelisches Gesangbuch and Gotteslob. From the 1930s, the hymn has often been rendered as "Dir, dir, o Höchster, will ich singen".

== History ==
Bartholomäus Crasselius was a Lutheran pastor who studied in Halle August Hermann Francke and was influenced by Pietism. He wrote the text of "Dir, dir, Jehova, will ich singen", published in 1695 (Note: In 1695, the sacred song was first published in Hasselsches Gesangbuch by Luppius. In 1697 and 1704 (Freylinghausen's Songbook), it was published in Geistreiches Gesangbuch (Halle, Germany), page 587.) with a melody from Hamburg. (Note: In 1690, the tune "Dir, Dir, Jehova" was published anonymously in Georg Wittwe's Musikalisches Handbuch der Geistlichen Melodien.) A different melody by Johann Sebastian Bach appeared in as a four-part chorale, "Dir, dir, Jehova, will ich singen", BWV 299, in the 1725 Notebook for Anna Magdalena Bach. He adapted it to a version for voice and continuo in Schemellis Gesangbuch, BWV 452. (Note: BWV 299, Choralsätze der Sammlung Dietel: mixed chorus (SATB), BWV 452, Schemellis Gesangbuch: voice, continuo)

The hymn became commonly distributed and used. The song became part of many German hymnals. Under the Nazi regime, Protestant groups aimed at avoiding words regarded as Jewish, and "Jehova" was replaced by "Höchster" (Highest). Another interpretation is, that not uttering the name of God also has something to do with respect for people who believe in Judaism. In the Protestant hymnal Evangelisches Kirchengesangbuch it was EG 237, and in the 1995 edition Evangelisches Gesangbuch, it is EG 328. It was included in the Catholic hymnal Gotteslob in regional sections, such as in the Diocese of Limburg as GL 811, in three stanzas, and with the 1690 melody from Hamburg.

== Text and translation ==
"Dir, dir, Jehova, will ich singen" is written in seven stanzas of six lines each. It is in bar form. The song was translated into English by Catherine Winkworth in 1863 as "Jehovah, let me now adore Thee".
