= Notebook for Anna Magdalena Bach =

Manuscripts by Johann Sebastian Bach

External audio
- You may hear selections from Bach's Anna Magdalena Notebook as performed by Gustav Leonhardt; Here on Archive.org

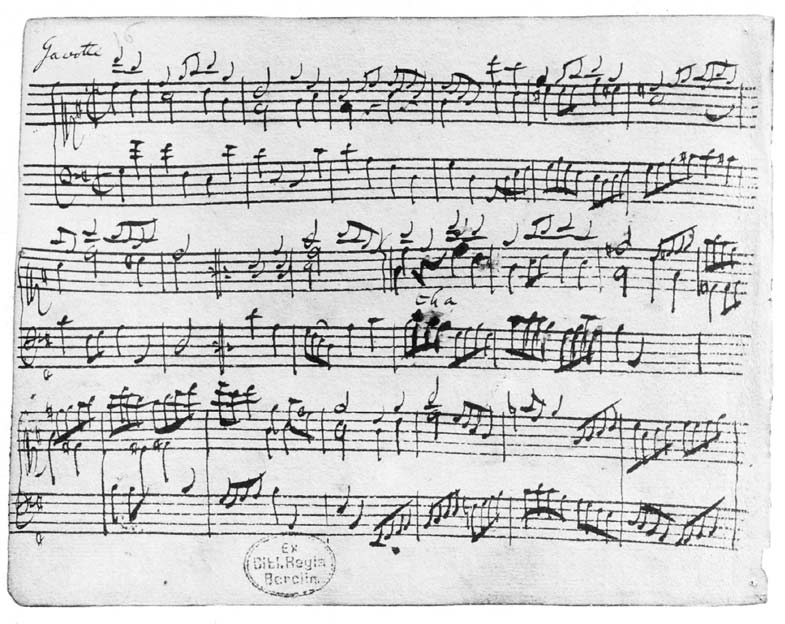
This page of the 1722 notebook contains the gavotte from French Suite No. 5 (BWV 816).

The title Notebook for Anna Magdalena Bach (German: Notenbüchlein für Anna Magdalena Bach) refers to either of two manuscript notebooks that the German Baroque composer Johann Sebastian Bach presented to his second wife, Anna Magdalena. Keyboard music (minuets, rondeaux, polonaises, chorales, sonatas, preludes, musettes, marches, gavottes) makes up most of both notebooks, and a few pieces for voice (songs, and arias) are included.

The Notebooks provide a glimpse into the domestic music of the 18th century and the musical tastes of the Bach family. The second notebook contains a mixture of pieces known to be by J. S. Bach, pieces known to be by others, and pieces whose authorship is unknown or debated.

== History ==
The two notebooks are known by their title page dates of 1722 and 1725. The title "Anna Magdalena Notebook" is commonly used to refer to the latter. The primary difference between the two collections is that the 1722 notebook contains works only by Johann Sebastian Bach (including most of the French Suites), while the 1725 notebook is a compilation of music by both Bach and other composers of the era.

=== The 1722 notebook: French Suites and miscellany ===
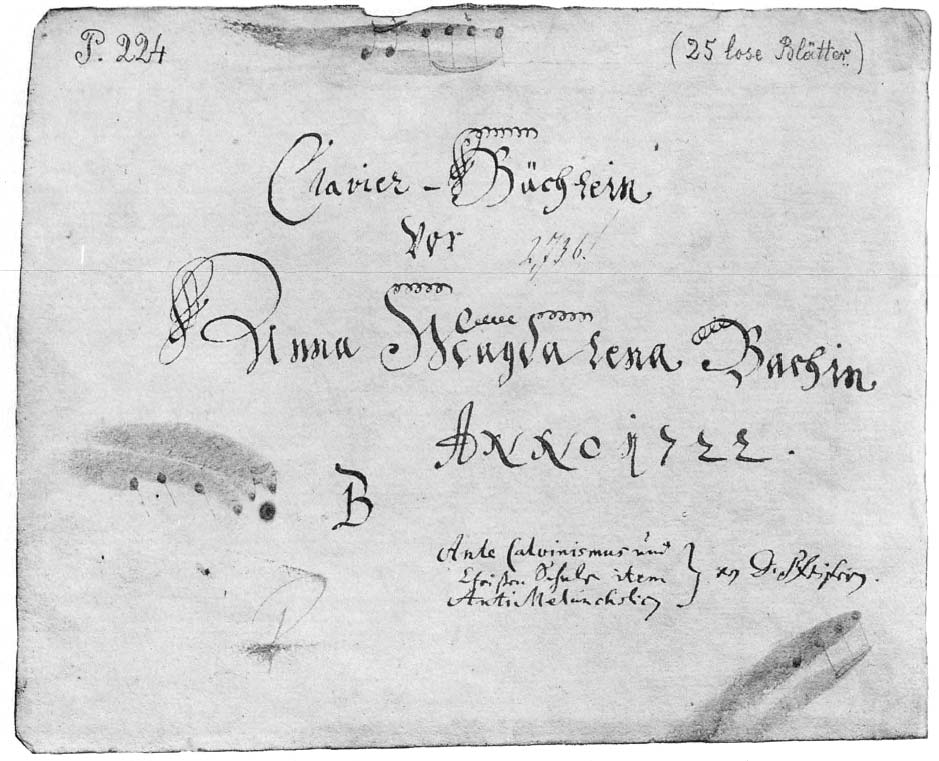
Title page of the first (1722) Notebook for Anna Magdalena Bach. Note the titles of the three Pfeiffer books written by Bach in the lower right corner.

This notebook contains 25 unbound sheets (including two blank pages), which is estimated to be approximately a third of the original size. It is not known what happened to the other pages. The back and the corners are decorated with brown leather; greenish paper is used for the cover. The title page is inscribed Clavier-Büchlein vor Anna Magdalena Bachin ANNO 1722 in Anna Magdalena's hand (using the feminine version of her last name). For a reason so far unknown to researchers, Johann Sebastian wrote the titles of three books by theologian August Pfeiffer (died 1698) in the lower right corner of the title page:

- Ante Calvinismus is a shortened and misspelled title of Anti-Calvinismus, oder Unterredungen von der Reformierten Religion (Anti-Calvinism, or Conversations about the reformed religion).
- "Christen Schule item" refers to Pfeiffer's Evangelische Christen Schule ("Evangelical Christian School").
- AntiMelancholicus refers to Anti-melancholicus, oder Melancholey-Vertreiber (Anti-melancholy, or [something or someone] to drive out the melancholy).

The notebook contains the following works, most in Johann Sebastian's hand:

- Five keyboard suites. The first three are fragments of the pieces that are now known as the first three French Suites, BWV 812–814. The next two are complete suites, French Suites Nos. 4 and 5, BWV 815–816. The minuets of suites 2 and 3 are separated from the rest of their respective suites and were most probably added at a later date by Anna Magdalena Bach (they are almost certainly in her hand), some time before 1725.
- Fantasia pro organo, unfinished, BWV 573. A short organ piece, 12 complete bars and the beginning notes of the 13th bar.
- Air with variations in C minor, unfinished, BWV 991. The first 10 bars feature coherent two-part writing, but the remaining 35 bars only have one voice written out.
- "Jesus, meine Zuversicht", chorale prelude, BWV 728. A brief (9 bars) piece in three voices, features two sections with repeats for each.
- Minuet in G major, BWV 841 (not to be confused with Petzold's Minuet in G major in the 1725 notebook). A short dance with simplistic two-part writing and two sections with repeats for each.

=== The 1725 notebook ===
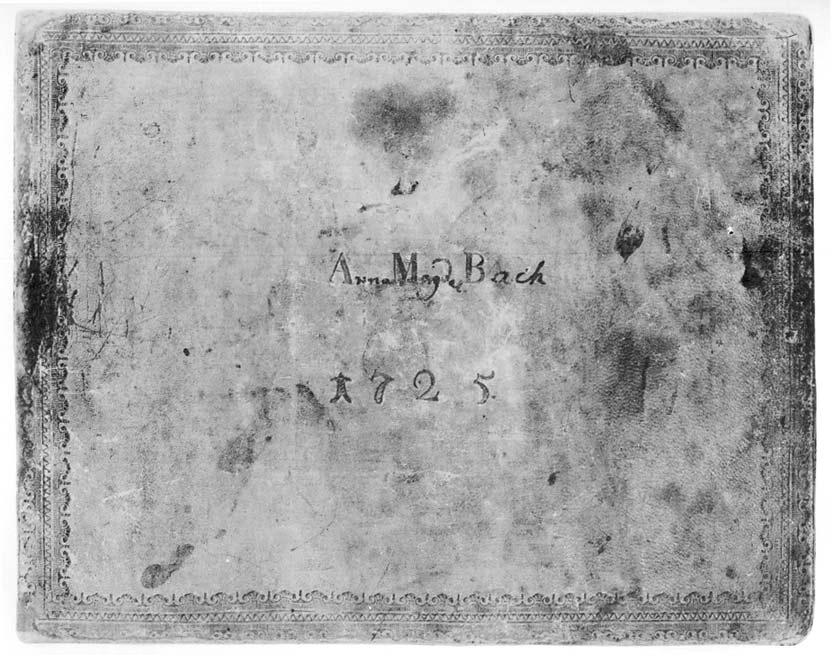
Cover of the second (1725) Notebook for Anna Magdalena Bach External audio: You may hear selections from Bach's Anna Magdalena Notebook as performed by the organist E. Power Biggs; Here on Archive.org

The 1725 notebook is larger than the 1722 one, and more richly decorated. Light green paper is used for the front cover. Anna Magdalena's initials and the year number "1725" are printed in gold. The later annotations [A]nna [M]agdal [B]ach were added by her stepson C. P. E. Bach when he inherited it. All pages feature gilt edging. Most of the entries in the 1725 notebook were made by Anna Magdalena herself, with others written in the hand of Johann Sebastian, some by sons Johann Christian and Carl Philipp Emanuel, and a few by family friends such as Johann Gottfried Bernhard and Johann Gottfried Heinrich.

The 1725 notebook contains works composed by Johann Sebastian Bach and also pieces by many other composers. The authorship of several pieces is identified in the notebook itself, while that of others was established by researchers. The composers of still others, including several popular songs of the time, remain unknown. Here is a complete list of the pieces included, in order of appearance in the notebook:

1. Keyboard partita in A minor, BWV 827. This is the third partita from Bach's set of Partitas for keyboard BWV 825–830, which was published in 1731 as the first volume of Clavier-Übung.
2. Keyboard partita in E minor, BWV 830. This is the sixth partita from Bach's set of Partitas for keyboard BWV 825–830.
3. Minuet in F major, BWV Anh. 113.
4. Minuet in G major, BWV Anh. 114. Usually attributed to Christian Petzold.
5. Minuet in G minor, BWV Anh. 115. Usually attributed to Christian Petzold.
6. Rondeau in B♭ major, BWV Anh. 183. This piece is by François Couperin and is best known under the original title: Les Bergeries (6e Ordre).
7. Minuet in G major, BWV Anh. 116
8. Polonaise in F major, BWV Anh. 117a
  Polonaise in F major, BWV Anh. 117b
9. Minuet in B♭ major, BWV Anh. 118
10. Polonaise in G minor, BWV Anh. 119
11. Chorale prelude "Wer nur den lieben Gott läßt walten", BWV 691
12. Chorale setting "Gib dich zufrieden und sei stille" in F major, BWV 510
13. Chorale setting "Gib dich zufrieden und sei stille" in G minor, BWV 511
  Chorale setting "Gib dich zufrieden und sei stille" in E minor, BWV 512
14. Minuet in A minor, BWV Anh. 120
15. Minuet in C minor, BWV Anh. 121
16. March in D major, BWV Anh. 122. Usually attributed to Carl Philipp Emanuel Bach.
17. Polonaise in G minor, BWV Anh. 123. Usually attributed to Carl Philipp Emanuel Bach.
18. March in G major, BWV Anh. 124. Usually attributed to Carl Philipp Emanuel Bach.
19. Polonaise in G minor, BWV Anh. 125. Usually attributed to Carl Philipp Emanuel Bach.
20. Aria "So oft ich meine Tobackspfeife" in D minor, BWV 515
  Aria "So oft ich meine Tobackspfeife" in G minor, BWV 515a
21. Menuet fait par Mons. Böhm, by Georg Böhm. Not included in the BWV catalogue.
22. Musette in D major, BWV Anh. 126
23. March in E♭ major, BWV Anh. 127
24. (Polonaise) in D minor, BWV Anh. 128
25. Aria "Bist du bei mir", BWV 508. This composition is probably the most well-known of the arias of the 1725 notebook. Its melody is by Gottfried Heinrich Stölzel.
26. Keyboard aria in G major, BWV 988/1. Another well-known piece, this is the aria of the Goldberg Variations, BWV 988. Christoph Wolff has suggested that this Aria was entered into the two blank pages of this book by Anna Magdalena later, in 1740.
27. Solo per il cembalo in E♭ major, BWV Anh. 129. A harpsichord piece by Carl Philipp Emanuel Bach.
28. Polonaise in G major, BWV Anh. 130. Possibly composed by Johann Adolph Hasse.
29. Prelude in C major, BWV 846/1. This is the first prelude from The Well-Tempered Clavier, Book 1, with bars 16–20 omitted, most likely in order to make the piece fit in two pages.
30. Keyboard suite in D minor, BWV 812. This is the first French Suite.
31. Keyboard suite in C minor, BWV 813. This is an incomplete version of the second French Suite.
32. Movement in F major, BWV Anh. 131. The handwriting looks like that of a child, and apparently the piece is an attempt to create a bass line for a given melody.
33. Aria "Warum betrübst du dich", BWV 516
34. Recitative "Ich habe genug" and aria "Schlummert ein, ihr matten Augen" (solo), BWV 82/2,3
35. Chorale setting "Schaff's mit mir, Gott", BWV 514
36. Minuet in D minor, BWV Anh. 132
37. Aria "Willst du dein Herz mir schenken" (subtitled "Aria di Giovannini"), BWV 518
38. Aria "Schlummert ein, ihr matten Augen", unfinished, BWV 82/3
39. Chorale setting "Dir, dir Jehova, will ich singen" (version for choir), BWV 299
  Chorale setting "Dir, dir Jehova, will ich singen" (solo), BWV 299
40. Song "Wie wohl ist mir, o Freund der Seelen", BWV 517
41. Aria "Gedenke doch, mein Geist, zurücke", BWV 509
42. Chorale "O Ewigkeit, du Donnerwort", BWV 513

== Compositions ==
The Notebooks contain instrumental as well as vocal musical compositions. These notebooks serve more as collections of sheet music and other compositions rather than what notebooks are traditionally used for.

=== Recitative and Aria from Cantata Ich habe genug, BWV 82 ===
The recitative "Ich habe genug" and the aria "Schlummert ein, ihr matten Augen", the second and third movements of the second version of Cantata Ich habe genug, BWV 82, appear in the 1725 Notebook.

=== Four-part chorale "Dir, dir, Jehova, will ich singen", BWV 299 ===
The four-part chorale "Dir, dir, Jehova, will ich singen", BWV 299, also appears in a two-part setting in Schemellis Musicalisches Gesang-Buch (BWV 452).

=== Songs and arias, BWV 508–518 ===
The second Notebook contains a number of songs and arias set for voice and continuo.

==== Aria "Bist du bei mir", BWV 508 ====
"Bist du bei mir"
Performed by soprano Elisabeth Schumann, 1934

"Bist du bei mir", BWV 508, is an arrangement of an aria of the opera Diomedes by Gottfried Heinrich Stölzel.

==== Aria "Gedenke doch, mein Geist", BWV 509 ====
"Gedenke doch, mein Geist, zurücke", BWV 509 is an aria contained in the second notebook.

==== Three settings of "Gib dich zufrieden", BWV 510–512 ====
The sacred songs BWV 510–512 are three settings of "Gib dich zufrieden und sei stille" for voice and continuo.

==== Sacred song "O Ewigkeit, du Donnerwort", BWV 513 ====
The sacred song "O Ewigkeit, du Donnerwort", BWV 513, No. 42 in the second Notebook, is a setting of the chorale melody with the same name, for voice and continuo:

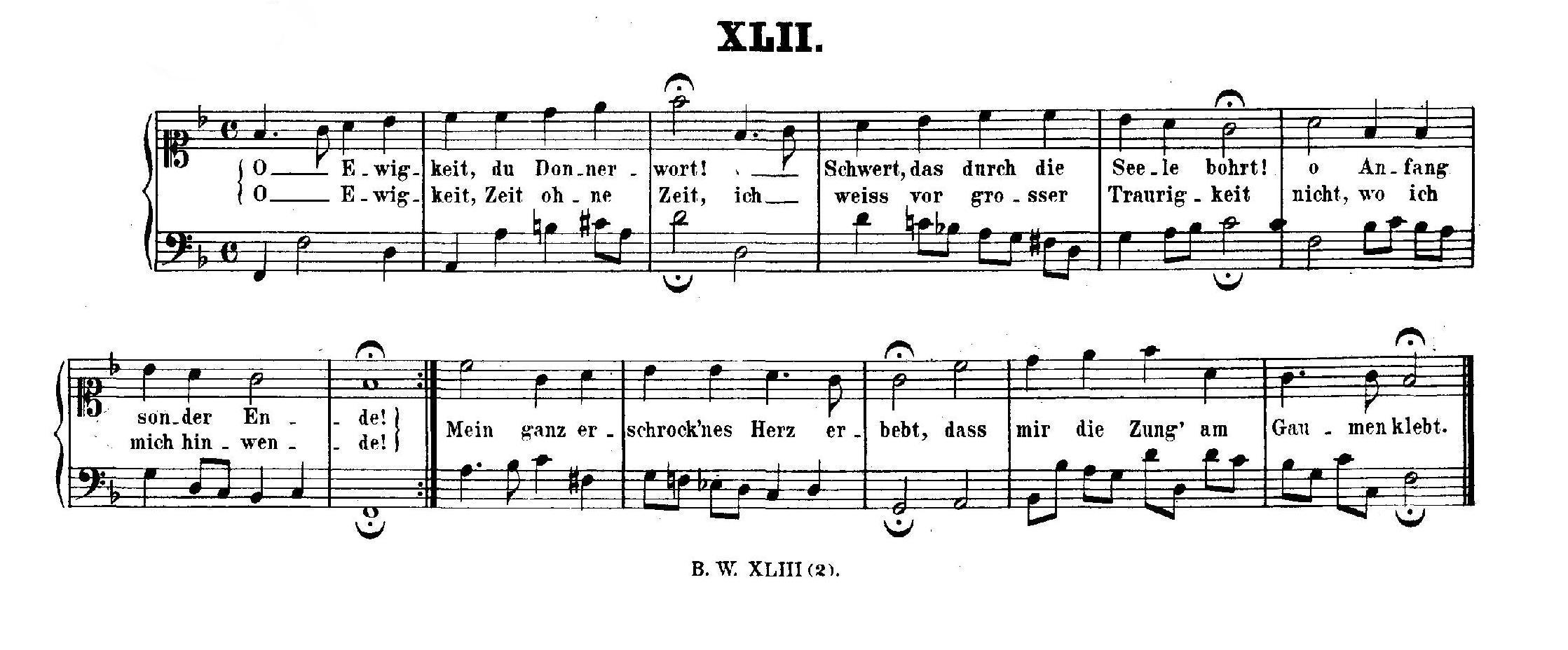

BWV 397 is the four-part realisation of this song.

==== Sacred song "Schaffs mit mir, Gott", BWV 514 ====
"Schaffs mit mir, Gott", BWV 514, is a sacred song for voice and continuo.

==== Aria "So oft ich meine Tobackspfeife", BWV 515–515a ====
So oft ich meine Tobackspfeife, BWV 515 (4:49)
Ukrainian words by M. Strikha

The aria "So oft ich meine Tobackspfeife" appears in two versions, BWV 515 and 515a, the second a fourth higher than the first.

==== Aria "Warum betrübst du dich", BWV 516 ====
The aria "Warum betrübst du dich", BWV 516, is a setting for voice and continuo.

==== Sacred song "Wie wohl ist mir, o Freund der Seelen", BWV 517 ====
"Wie wohl ist mir, o Freund der Seelen", BWV 517, is a sacred song for voice and continuo.

==== "Aria di G[i]ovannini", BWV 518 ====
The authenticity of "Willst du dein Herz mir schenken", BWV 518, also known as "Aria di G[i]ovannini", is doubted.

=== For organ ===
The first Notebook contains two compositions for organ. The chorale prelude Wer nur den lieben Gott lässt walten is No. 11 in the second Notebook.

==== Fantasia in C major, BWV 573 ====
The Fantasia in C major for organ, BWV 573, is a fragment contained in the 1722 Notebook.

==== Chorale prelude Wer nur den lieben Gott lässt walten, BWV 691 ====
The chorale prelude "Wer nur den lieben Gott lässt walten", BWV 691, also appears in the Kirnberger Collection.

==== Chorale setting Jesus, meine Zuversicht, BWV 728 ====
The chorale setting Jesus, meine Zuversicht, BWV 728, is ranged among Bach's chorale preludes for organ.

=== For keyboard ===
The keyboard pieces are the largest group of compositions in both Notebooks.

==== Five French Suites, BWV 812–816 ====
The first Notebook contains early versions of the first five French Suites, BWV 812–816. the first and the second French Suite also appear in the second Notebook.

==== Third and sixth partita from Clavier-Übung I, BWV 827 and 830 ====
The second Notebook starts with the third Partita, BWV 827, from Clavier-Übung I, followed by the sixth Partita, BWV 830, from that opus.

==== Minuet in G major, BWV 841 ====
The Minuet in G major, BWV 841, is also contained in the Klavierbüchlein für Wilhelm Friedemann Bach.

==== First prelude of The Well-Tempered Clavier, BWV 846/1 ====
The prelude of Prelude and Fugue in C major, BWV 846, from The Well-Tempered Clavier appears in a short version in the second Notebook.

==== Aria of the Goldberg Variations, BWV 988/1 ====
No. 26 in the second Notebook is the aria with which the Goldberg Variations start:

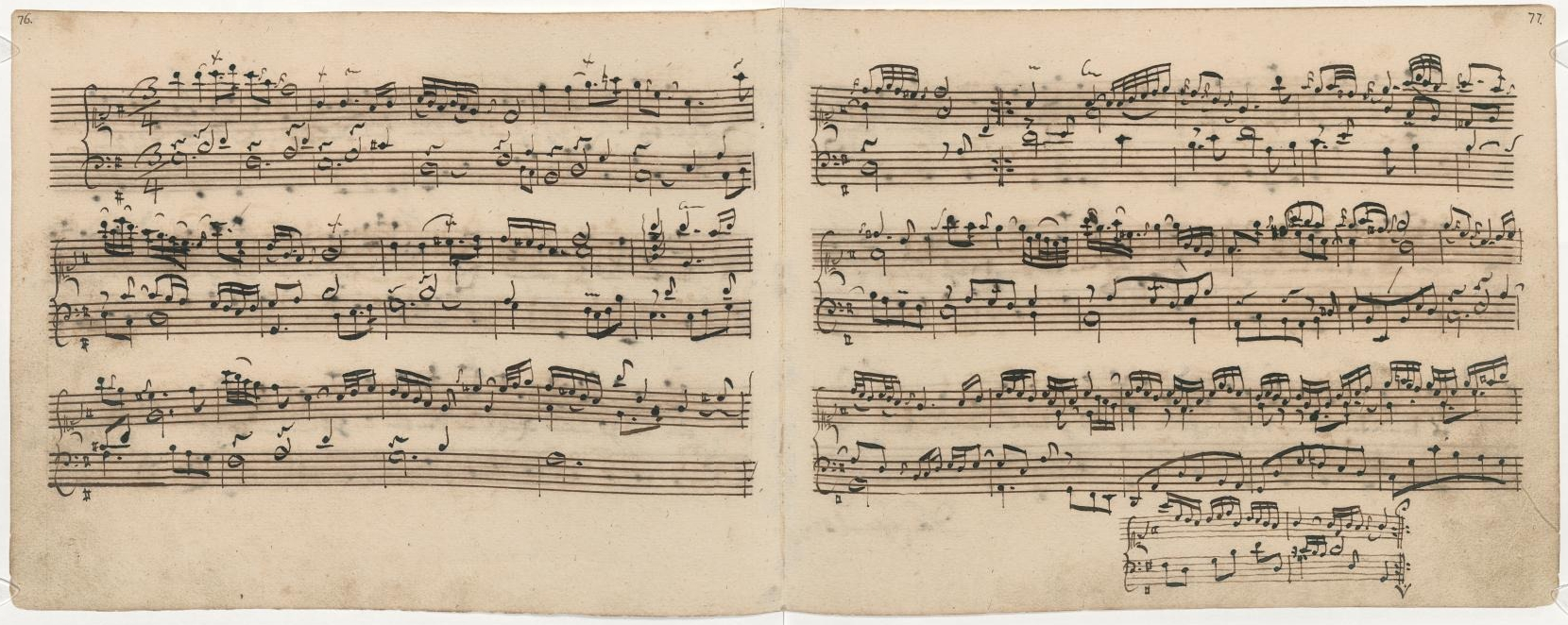

==== Air with variations, BWV 991 ====
The Air with variations in C minor, BWV 991, is a fragment contained in the first Notebook.

==== Minuet in F major, BWV Anh. 113 ====
The Minuet in F major, BWV Anh. 113, is No. 3 in the second Notebook. Its attribution to J. S. Bach is considered doubtful, and for that reason it is included in Anhang (Anh.) II of the Bach-Werke-Verzeichnis.

==== Two Minuets by Christian Petzold, BWV Anh. 114–115 ====
Start of Minuet in G major, BWV Anh. 114:

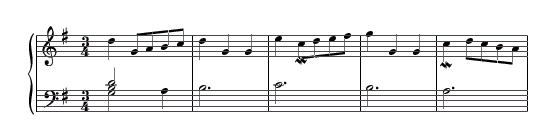

The two Minuets in G major and G minor, Nos. 4–5 in the second Notebook, BWV Anh. 114 and 115, were composed by Christian Petzold. Because their former attribution to Bach is spurious they appear in Anh. III of the Bach-Werke-Verzeichnis.

==== Four Minuets and three Polonaises, BWV Anh. 116–121 ====
Polonaise, No. 8a
Polonaise in F major, BWV Anh. 117a
attribution to J. S. Bach

Seven pieces with a doubtful attribution to J. S. Bach:

- Anh. II 116 – No. 7: Minuet in G major
- Anh. II 117a and 117b – No. 8a and b: two Polonaises in F major
- Anh. II 118 – No. 9: Minuet in B♭ major
- Anh. II 119 – No. 10: Polonaise in G minor
- Anh. II 120 – No. 14: Minuet in A minor
- Anh. II 121 – No. 15: Minuet in C minor

==== Two Marches and two Polonaises by Carl Philipp Emanuel Bach, BWV Anh. 122–125 ====
Nos. 16–19 (BWV Anh. 122–125) are considered to be early compositions by Carl Philipp Emanuel Bach:

- Anh. III 122 – No. 16: March in D major (H 1/1)
- Anh. III 123 – No. 17: Polonaise in G minor (H 1/2)
- Anh. III 124 – No. 18: March in G major (H 1/3)
- Anh. III 125 – No. 19: Polonaise in G minor (H 1/4)

==== Three pieces, BWV Anh. 126–128 ====
A musette and two other pieces with a doubtful attribution to J. S. Bach:

- Anh. II 126 – No. 22: Musette in D major
- Anh. II 127 – No. 23: March in E♭ major
- Anh. II 128 – No. 24: (Polonaise) in D minor

==== Solo per il cembalo by Carl Philipp Emanuel Bach, BWV Anh. 129 ====
Opening bars of Solo per il cembalo, BWV Anh. 129, by Carl Philipp Emanuel Bach, piece No. 27 from the 1725 Notebook:

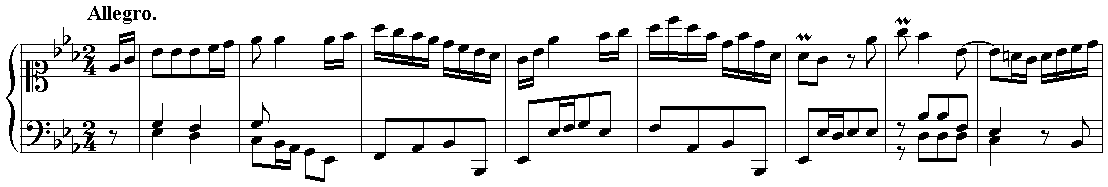

Anh. III 129 – No. 27: Solo per il cembalo in E♭ major by C. P. E. Bach (early version of the keyboard sonata Wq 65.7 / H 16).

==== Polonaise in G major by Johann Adolph Hasse, BWV Anh. 130 ====
Anh. III 130 – No. 28: Polonaise in G major by Johann Adolph Hasse, i.e. "Polonoise secondo", originally in F major, from his keyboard sonata in F major.

==== Piece in F major by Johann Christian Bach, BWV Anh. 131 ====
Untitled movement in F major, BWV Anh. 131, piece No. 32 from the 1725 Notebook:

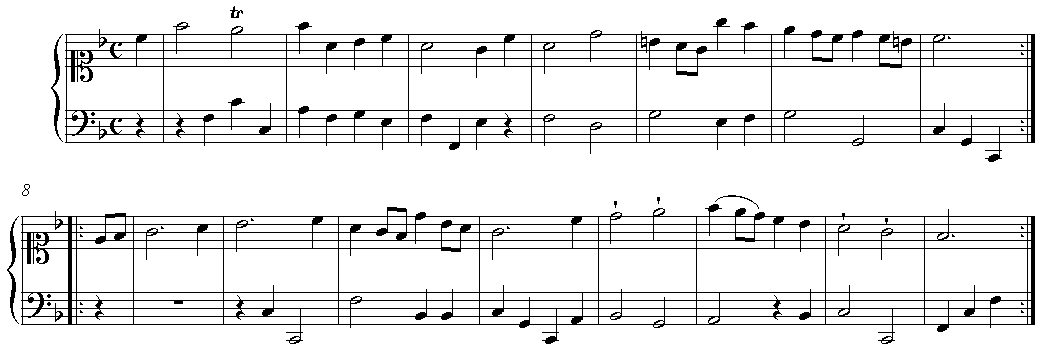

Anh. III 131 – No. 32: [March] in F major attributed to Johann Christian Bach (W A22), formerly also attributed to Gottfried Heinrich Bach

==== Minuet in D minor, BWV Anh. 132 ====
Anh. II 132 – No. 36: Minuet in D minor

==== "Rondeau" by François Couperin, BWV Anh. 183 ====
Anh. III 183 – No. 6: Rondeau in B♭ major by François Couperin, "Les Bergeries, Rondeau", sixth piece of the Sixième ordre, published in Paris in 1717 (Second Livre de pièces de Clavecin)

==== "Menuet fait par Mons. Böhm" ====
No. 21 of the second Notebook, "Menuet fait par Mons. Böhm" (Minuet by Mr. Böhm), in G major, was never assigned a number in the BWV catalogue. It is however included in both the Bach-Gesellschaft Ausgabe (BGA) and the New Bach Edition (Neue Bach-Ausgabe, NBA) of the Notebooks. There is some doubt which composer by the name Böhm may have been intended, Georg Böhm being the best known among them.

== See also ==
- Klavierbüchlein für Wilhelm Friedemann Bach, a notebook J.S. Bach compiled for his eldest son
- De Gruytters carillon book, a music manuscript from Antwerp at the same time period
- Anna Magdalena, a 1998 Hong Kong film titled after the Notebook; Minuet in G is featured extensively throughout the movie.
- List of songs and arias by Johann Sebastian Bach from the 1725 Notebook for Anna Magdalena (BWV 508–518)
- The 1725 Notebook for Anna Magdalena compositions in the appendix of the BWV catalogue

== Sources ==
Manuscripts:

- 1. Klavierbüchlein der A. M. Bach, 1722: D-B Mus. ms. Bach P 224 at Bach Digital website
- 2. Notenbüchlein der A. M. Bach, 1725: D-B Mus. ms. Bach P 225 at Bach Digital website

Score editions with critical commentary:

- Paul Waldersee, editor. Bach-Gesellschaft Ausgabe, Vol. 43^{2} [plate B.W. XLIII(2)]: Joh. Seb. Bach's Musikstücke in den Notenbüchern der Anna Magdalena Bach (Joh. Seb. Bach's music pieces in the notebooks of Anna Magdalena Bach). Leipzig: Breitkopf & Härtel (1894)
- Georg von Dadelsen, editor. New Bach Edition, Series V: Keyboard and Lute Works, Vol. 4: The Klavierbüchlein für Anna Magdalena Bach from 1722 and 1725. Bärenreiter: Score (1957, ^{2}1963, ^{3}1978, ^{4}2014) and Critical Commentary (1957)
- Ernst-Günter Heinemann, editor. J.S. Bach: Notebook for Anna Magdalena Bach (Urtext edition). G. Henle Verlag, 1983. Includes Preface and Critical commentary
