= Ich steh an deiner Krippen hier =

German Christmas hymn by Paul Gerhardt

- Christmas hymn
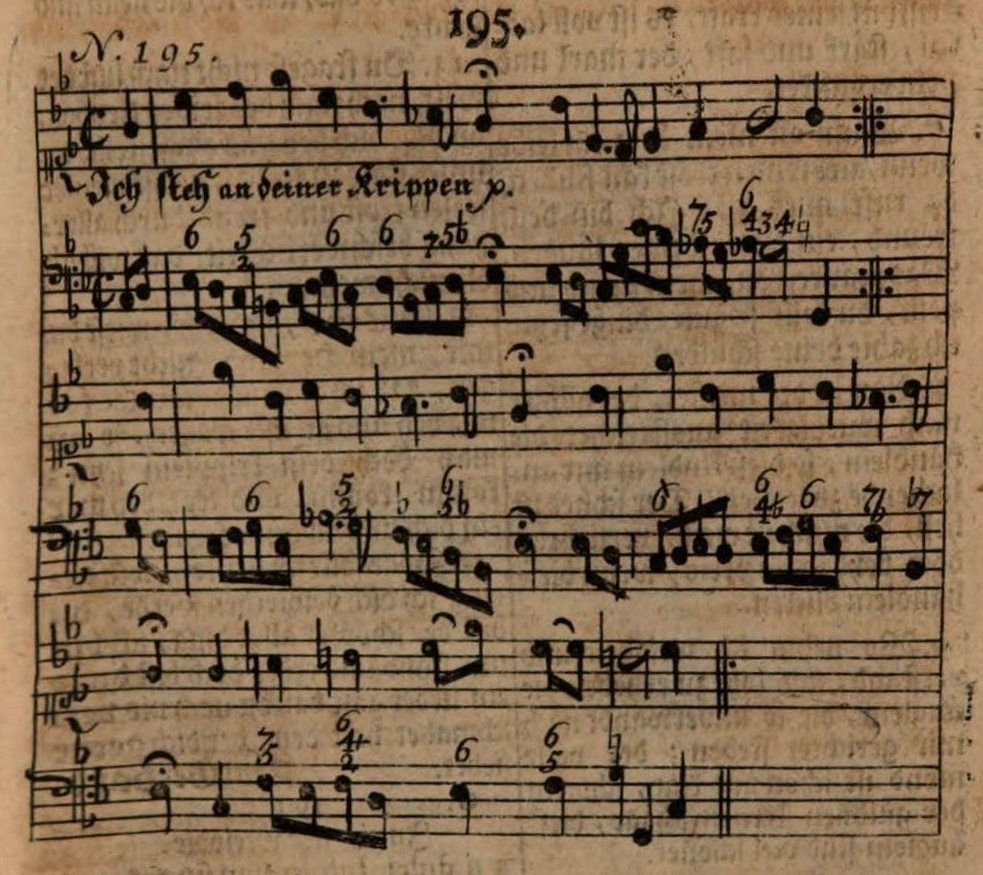
- Bach's BWV 469 melody with figured bass in Schemelli's Musicalisches Gesang-Buch 1736
- English: I stand by your manger here
- Text: by Paul Gerhardt
- Language: German
- Melody: Zahn 4429a and 4659–4666
- Published: 1653

"Ich steh an deiner Krippen hier" (I stand by your manger here) is a German Christmas hymn, with lyrics by Paul Gerhardt which were first published in 1653. It was then sung with an older melody by Martin Luther, but a melody which was likely created by Johann Sebastian Bach for Schemellis Gesangbuch of 1736 is now part of current Protestant and Catholic hymnals.

== History ==
The Lutheran theologian and minister Paul Gerhardt wrote the text of 15 stanzas. It was first published in the fifth edition of Johann Crüger's hymnal Praxis pietatis melica in 1653. It was first a song of individual reflection and devotion, which became part of congregational singing only later, such as in 1709 in the hymnal Geistliche und Liebliche Lieder by Johann Porst.

In Germany, it is present in both the 1993 Protestant (Evangelisches Gesangbuch) and Catholic hymnals (Gotteslob). It is also part of several other hymnals and song books.

== Text ==
The text of the original stanzas 1, 3, 4 and 5 is given, as in the Protestant and Catholic hymnals:

Ich steh an deiner Krippen hier,
o Jesu, du mein Leben;
ich komme, bring und schenke dir,
was du mir hast gegeben.
Nimm hin, es ist mein Geist und Sinn,
Herz, Seel und Mut, nimm alles hin
und laß dir's wohlgefallen.

Da ich noch nicht geboren war,
da bist du mir geboren
und hast mich dir zu eigen gar,
eh ich dich kannt, erkoren.
Eh ich durch deine Hand gemacht,
da hast du schon bei dir bedacht,
wie du mein wolltest werden.

Ich lag in tiefster Todesnacht,
du warest meine Sonne,
die Sonne, die mir zugebracht
Licht, Leben, Freud und Wonne.
O Sonne, die das werte Licht
des Glaubens in mir zugericht',
wie schön sind deine Strahlen!

Ich sehe dich mit Freuden an
und kann mich nicht satt sehen;
und weil ich nun nichts weiter kann,
bleib ich anbetend stehen.
O daß mein Sinn ein Abgrund wär
und meine Seel ein weites Meer,
daß ich dich möchte fassen!

I stand before Thy manger fair,
My Jesus, Life from heaven!
I come, and unto Thee I bear
What Thou to me hast given.
Receive it, for 'tis mind and soul,
Heart, spirit, strength—receive it all,
And deign to let it please Thee.

When I as yet had not been born,
Then hadst Thou been born for me
And chosen me to be Thine own,
Thy mercy shedding o'er me.
Before I by Thy hand was made,
Thou hadst the plan in order laid,
How Thou Thyself shouldst give me.

I lay still in death's deepest night,
Till Thou, my Sun, arising,
Didst bring joy, pleasure, life, and light,
My wakened soul surprising.
O Sun, who dost so graciously
Cause faith's good light to dawn in me,
How lovely is Thy radiance!

With rapture do I gaze on Thee,
Nor can enough adore Thee,
Pow'r more to do is not in me,
I'll praise and bow before Thee.
Oh that my mind were an abyss,
My soul a sea, wide, bottomless,
That so I might embrace Thee.

== Tunes and settings ==
Johannes Zahn listed eight hymn tunes which were specifically composed for "Ich steh an deiner Krippen hier" and which originated or were first published between 1667 and 1883 (Zahn 4659–4666). One of these melodies, Zahn 4663, was first published as No. 195 in Schemellis Gesangbuch in 1736.

Luther composed two hymn tunes for "Nun freut euch, lieben Christen g'mein": the Praxis pietatis melica of 1653 specifies the second of these, the one that was published in the Klugsches Gesangbuch, as melody for Gerhardt's text.

The hymn was published with the "Nun freut euch, lieben Christen" tune in the Gotteslob of 1975. In the Gotteslob of 2013 it was published with the melody from Schemellis Gesangbuch as GL 256 in the common section, with a note about the alternative melody in GL 258, "Lobpreiset all zu dieser Zeit" that also uses Luther's tune for "Nun freut euch". The older tune has been retained in regional sections, for example GL 758 in the Gotteslob of the Diocese of Limburg.

=== "Nun freut euch, lieben Christen" melody ===
The first print gives the melody of "Nun freut euch, lieben Christen", a melody by Martin Luther which was also used for "Es ist gewisslich an der Zeit" (EG 149). This melody, Zahn 4429a, appears in older hymnals, and in the Epiphany part of Johann Sebastian Bach's Christmas Oratorio, composed for the Christmas season of 1734–1735. Inserted in the narration of the Three Kings, the first stanza refers to them bringing gold, incense and myrrh, thus offering what the singer has to give, spirit and mind, heart, soul and courage ("mein Geist und Sinn, Herz, Seel und Mut").

=== Melody in Schemellis Gesangbuch ===
BWV 469 (tune)
MIDI realization, transposed to A minor

In 1736, Georg Christian Schemelli published in Leipzig a Musicalisches Gesang-Buch (Musical song book). Bach probably composed for this edition a melody in C minor which was intended for private devotion and solo singing. The Bach-Gesellschaft republished this setting of the song in 1892. The setting, known as BWV 469, includes, apart from the hymn tune, a figured bass accompaniment.

== See also ==
- List of Christmas carols

== Sources ==
- Becker, Hansjakob (2009). Geistliches Wunderhorn: Große deutsche Kirchenlieder. C. H. Beck. ISBN 978-3-406-59247-8.
- Schemelli, Georg Christian (1736). Musicalisches Gesang-Buch: Darinnen 954 geistreiche, sowohl alte als neue Lieder und Arien, mit wohlgesetzten Melodien, in Discant und Baß, befindlich sind (in German). Leipzig: Bernhard Christoph Breitkopf. RISM 990003407 RISM Catalogue description; Facsimile: 1077430 Liturg. 1372 o at Bavarian State Library.
- Zahn, Johannes (1890). Die siebenzeiligen und jambischen achtzeiligen Melodien. Die Melodien der deutschen evangelischen Kirchenlieder (in German). Vol. III. Gütersloh: Bertelsmann.
