= Komm, süßer Tod, komm selge Ruh =

1736 song by Johann Sebastian Bach

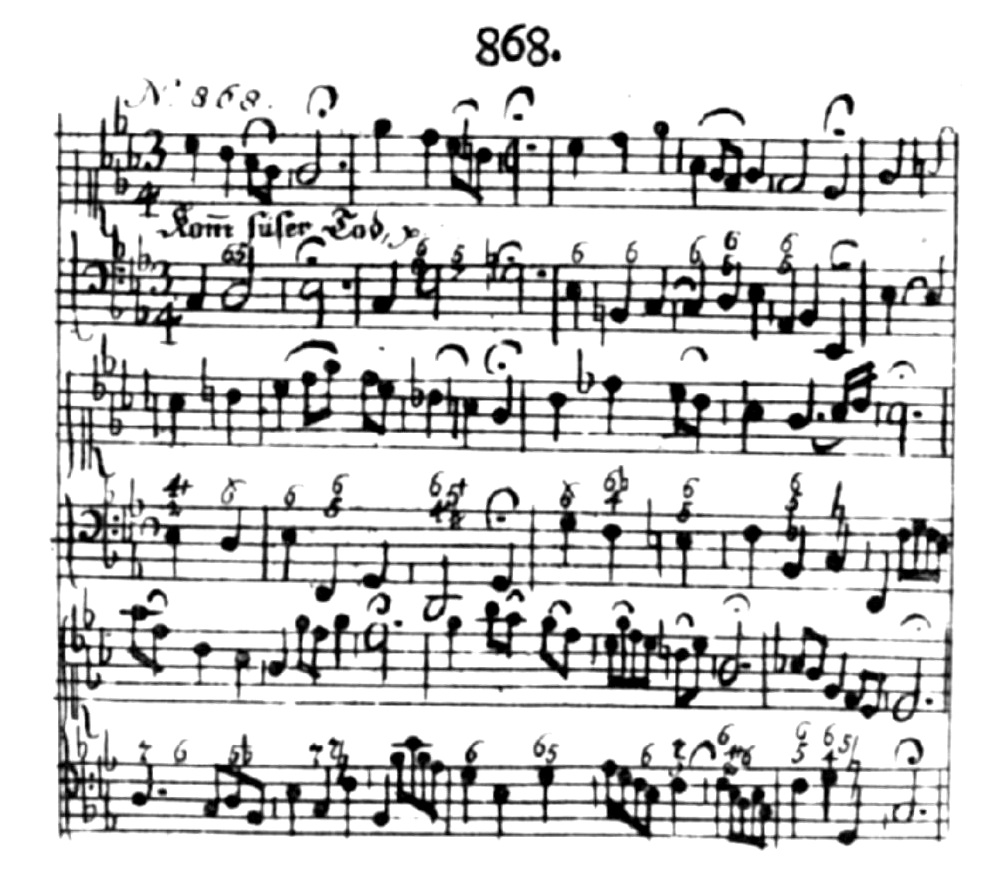
Komm, süßer Tod, first edition 1736

"Komm, süßer Tod, komm selge Ruh" (Come, sweet death, come, blessed rest) is a song for solo voice and basso continuo from the 69 Sacred Songs and Arias that Johann Sebastian Bach contributed to Musicalisches Gesang-Buch by Georg Christian Schemelli (BWV 478), edited by Schemelli in 1736. The text is by an anonymous author. Bach, by means of melody and harmony, expresses the desire for death and heaven. It is among his most popular works and has been adapted and transformed by several composers, such as Max Reger, Leopold Stokowski, Knut Nystedt, and for the Wanamaker Organ, by Virgil Fox.

Komm, süßer Tod, komm selge Ruh!
Komm führe mich in Friede,
weil ich der Welt bin müde,
ach komm! ich wart auf dich,
komm bald und führe mich,
drück mir die Augen zu.
Komm, selge Ruh!

Komm, süßer Tod, komm, selge Ruh!
Im Himmel ist es besser,
da alle Lust viel größer,
drum bin ich jederzeit
schon zum Valet bereit,
ich schließ die Augen zu.
Komm, selge Ruh!

Komm, süßer Tod, komm, selge Ruh!
O Welt, du Marterkammer,
ach! bleib mit deinem Jammer
auf dieser Trauerwelt,
der Himmel mir gefällt,
der Tod bringt mich darzu.
Komm, selge Ruh!

Komm, süßer Tod, komm, selge Ruh!
O, dass ich doch schon wäre
dort bei der Engel Heere,
aus dieser schwarzen Welt
ins blaue Sternenzelt,
hin nach dem Himmel zu.
O selge Ruh!

Komm, süßer Tod, komm, selge Ruh!
Ich will nun Jesum sehen
und bei den Engeln stehen.
Es ist nunmehr vollbracht,
drum, Welt, zu guter Nacht,
mein Augen sind schon zu.
Komm, selge Ruh!

Come, sweet death, come, blessed rest!
Come lead me to peace
for I am weary of the world,
O come! I wait for you,
come soon and lead me,
close my eyes.
Come, blessed rest!

Come, sweet death, come blessed rest!
It is better in heaven,
for there is all pleasure greater,
therefore I am at all times
prepared to say "Farewell,"
I close my eyes.
Come, blessed rest!

Come, sweet death, come blessed rest!
O world, you torture chamber,
oh! stay with your lamentations
in this world of sorrow,
it is heaven that I desire,
death shall bring me there.
Come, blessed rest!

Come, sweet death, come blessed rest!
Oh, that I were but already
there among the hosts of angels,
out of this black world
into the blue, starry firmament,
up to heaven.
O blessed rest!

Come, sweet death, come blessed rest!
I will now see Jesus
and stand among the angels.
It is henceforth completed,
so, world, good night,
my eyes are already closed.
Come, blessed rest.
