= Christoph Friedrich Richter =

German hymnwriter and entomologist

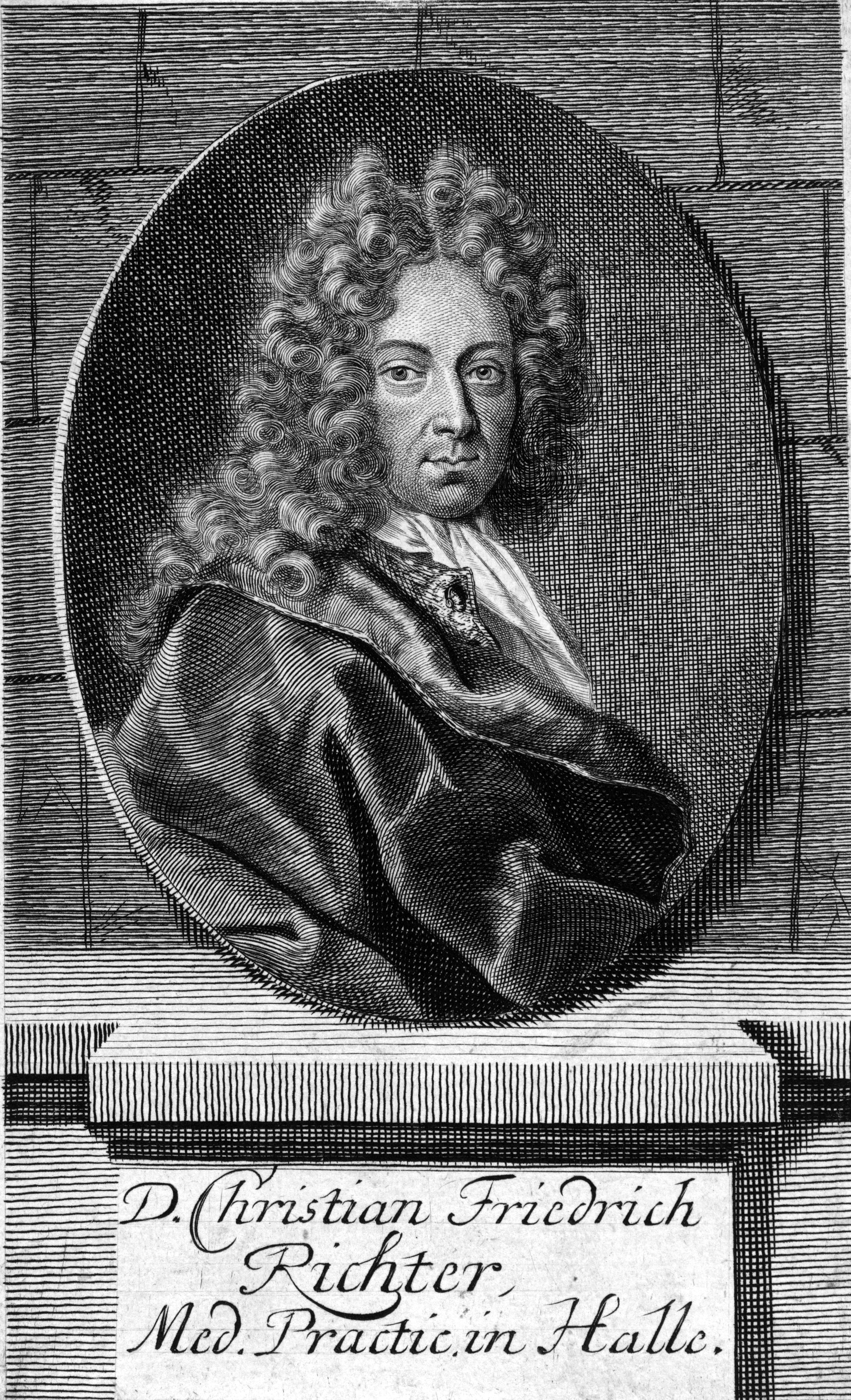
Christoph Friedrich Richter

Christoph, or Christian, Friedrich Richter (5 October 1676 – 5 October 1711) was a German hymnwriter and entomologist.

Christoph Richter was born in Sorau and was an evangelical clergyman, hymn writer and physician. He died in Halle.

== Works ==
- Die höchst-nöthige Erkenntniß des Menschen ..., oder der Unterricht von der Gesundheit, Ursachen, Namen und Curen der Kranckheiten, wie auch von rechtem Gebrauch der zu einer Haus-Reise- und Feld-Apothecken seligirten Medicamenten. Band 2 S.l., 1750. Digitized output of the University and State Library Düsseldorf
- Gaedike, R.; Groll, E. K. & Taeger, A. 2012: Bibliography of the entomological literature from the beginning until 1863 : online database - version 1.0 - Senckenberg Deutsches Entomologisches Institut. Bibliography
