= Andreas Glöckner =

German musicologist, a Bach scholar (born 1950)

- Born: 1950 (age 74–75); Sondershausen
- Education: University of Leipzig
- Occupation: Musicologist
- Organizations: Bach Archive; Bachfest Leipzig

Andreas Glöckner (born 1950 in Sondershausen) is a German musicologist, a Bach scholar who has served as the dramaturge of the Bachfest Leipzig.

== Career ==
Glöckner studied musicology at the University of Leipzig. He worked at the Bach Archive Leipzig from 1979 until 2015 and continues to work in a voluntary capacity at that institution. He received his Ph.D. from the University of Halle in 1988 and taught at the universities of Leipzig and Dresden. Since 2001 he has been a member of the external commission for the project Bach-Repertorium at the Saxon Academy of Sciences. He has published books, journal articles and radio features, and was the dramaturge of the Bachfest Leipzig from 1994 to 2016.

== Publications ==
- (ed.) Kalendarium zur Lebensgeschichte Johann Sebastian Bachs, Evangelische Verlagsanstalt, 2008
- Die Notenbibliothek der Thomasschule Bachfest Leipzig, 2012
