= Gottfried Heinrich Bach =

Son of composer J. S. Bach (1724 - 1763)

- Born: 26 February 1724; Leipzig, Electorate of Saxony
- Died: 12 February 1763 (funeral); Naumburg, Electorate of Saxony
- Known for: Child of Johann Sebastian Bach
- Parent: Johann Sebastian Bach (father) Anna Magdalena Bach (mother)

Gottfried Heinrich Bach (born: 26 February 1724 – funeral: 12 February 1763) was a child of Johann Sebastian Bach and the firstborn son of his second wife, Anna Magdalena Bach. He was born in Leipzig, where his parents had moved the year before his birth.

Gottfried Heinrich became "feeble-minded" (careless, shallow) at an early age, but in his childhood he played the keyboard well and C. P. E. Bach said he showed "a great genius, which however failed to develop".

After his father's death in 1750, Gottfried Heinrich continued to live with his mother. He received financial support from the town. His mother died in 1760. It is not known why Gottfried Heinrich was buried in Naumburg in 1763. At the time his sister Elisabeth Juliana Friderica Altnikol had not lived there for some years. She had moved from Leipzig to Naumburg when she married Johann Christoph Altnikol in 1749, where her husband was employed as an organist. After his death in 1759 she returned to Leipzig with her two daughters.
