= Bartholomäus Crasselius =

Bartholomäus Crasselius (Crasselt) (21 February 1667 - 10 November 1724) was a German Lutheran pastor and hymnwriter.

He produced a wealth of hymns, ten of which were published in Anastasius Freylinghausen's 1704 Geist-reiches Gesang-Buch. The Evangelisches Gesangbuch also includes his 1695 hymn "Dir, dir, o Höchster, will ich singen" (EG 328) – its first line originally ran "Dir, dir, Jehova, will ich singen", though "Jehova" was later revised to "Höchster".

== Life ==
Born in Wernsdorf, he studied at Halle University, where he became part of the circle of August Hermann Francke. After his final exams, he initially followed the then-usual course of working as a private tutor, including for the Countess of Schönburg at Schloss Glauchau and in 1693/94 to the family of merchant Franz Julius Pfeiffer in Lauenburg/Elbe. His Pietistic views led to theological arguments with Severin Walther Slüter, a pastor and superintendent in Lauenburg. Early in June 1694 Slüter had Crasselius expelled from that land. He next worked in the Electorate of Saxony, but he was also reprimanded for his Pietism by Saxony's state church and moved on to Nidda as a pastor in 1701 and finally to Düsseldorf in 1708, remaining at the latter until his death there in 1724.

== Bibliography ==
- (in German) Friedrich Wilhelm Bautz: "Bartholomäus Crasselius". In: Biographisch-Bibliographisches Kirchenlexikon (BBKL). Band 1, Bautz, Hamm 1975. 2., unveränderte Auflage Hamm 1990, ISBN 3-88309-013-1, Sp. 1154–1155.
- (in German) Ruth Engelhardt: Crasselius (Krasselt), Bartholomäus, in: Wolfgang Herbst (Hrg.): Komponisten und Liederdichter des Evangelischen Gesangbuchs. (= Handbuch zum Evangelischen Gesangbuch 2), Vandenhoeck & Ruprecht, Göttingen 1999, S. 65
- (in German) Carl Krafft: Crasselius, Bartholomäus. In: Allgemeine Deutsche Biographie (ADB). Band 4, Duncker & Humblot, Leipzig 1876, S. 566 f.
