= Schemellis Gesangbuch =

Song book

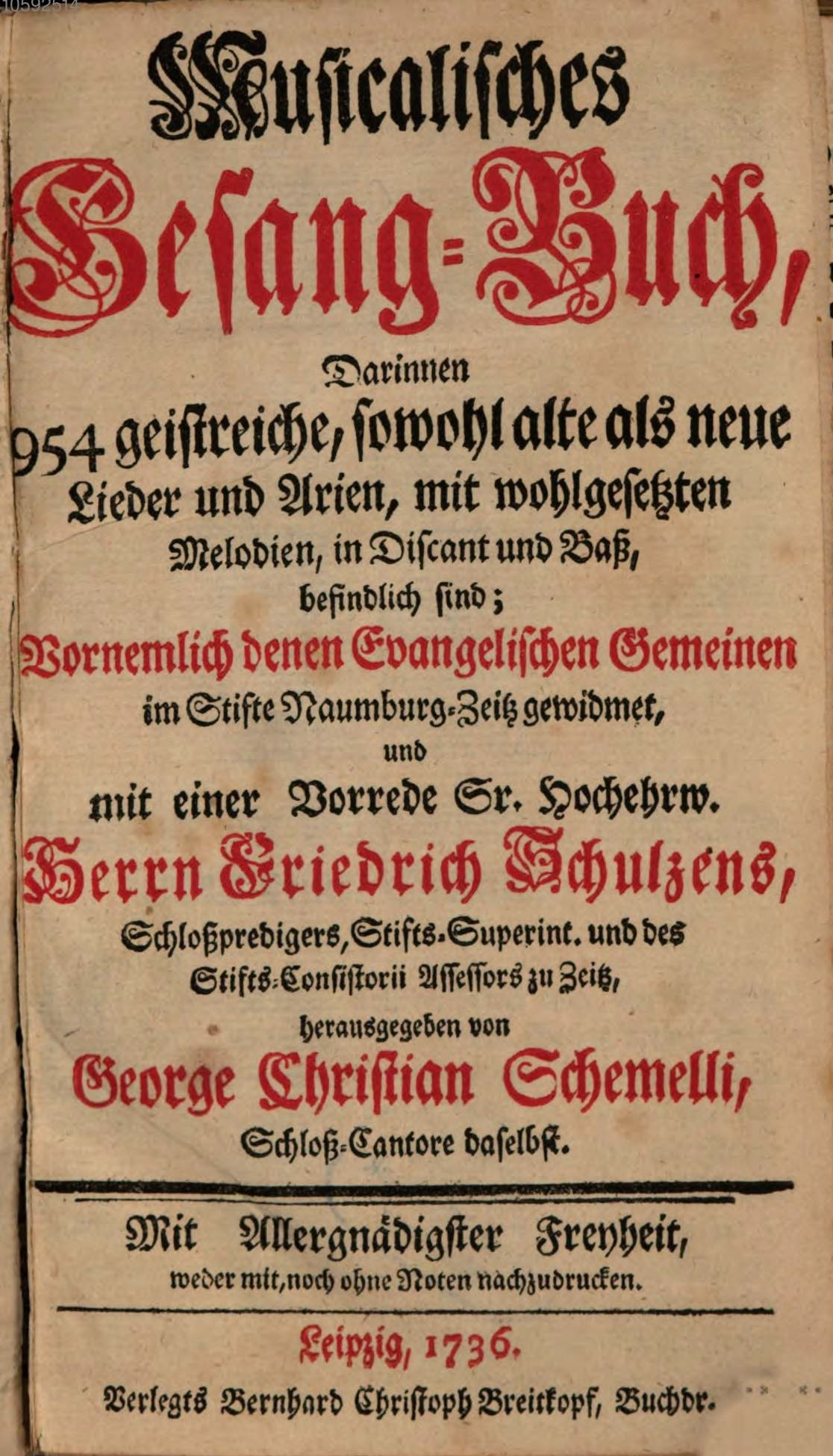
Title page of Schemelli's Musicalisches Gesang-Buch

Schemellis Gesangbuch (Schemelli's hymnal) is the common name of a collection of sacred songs titled Musicalisches Gesang-Buch (Musical song book) published in Leipzig in 1736 by Georg Christian Schemelli, to which Johann Sebastian Bach contributed.

== History ==
In 1736, Georg Christian Schemelli published Musicalisches Gesang-Buch in Leipzig, a collection of 954 sacred songs. The full title reads "Musicalisches Gesang-Buch, Darinnen 954 geistreiche, sowohl alte als neue Lieder und Arien, mit wohlgesetzten Melodien, in Discant und Baß, befindlich sind: Vornehmlich denen Evangelischen Gemeinen im Stifte Naumburg-Zeitz gewidmet" (Musical song book, with 954 spirited, both old as new songs and arias, with well-composed melodies in soprano and bass, in it: mostly dedicated to the Protestant parishioners in the Stift Naumburg-Zeitz). The texts were written in the tradition of pietism, and were probably intended for private contemplation. Only 69 of the songs come with music, a melody and a bass line. Many melodies resemble simple arias.

Johann Sebastian Bach contributed to the collection, but musicologists debate to what extent. Schemelli's son Christian Friedrich was a student of the Thomasschule from 1733 to 1735, and later studied at the Leipzig University, which explains the contact. In the Bach-Werke-Verzeichnis (BWV) of Bach's works, numbers 439 to 507 list songs from the collection, but his authorship is certain only for three of them, "Dir, dir Jehovah, will ich singen", BWV 452, "Komm, süßer Tod", BWV 478, and "Vergiss mein nicht, vergiss mein nicht", BWV 505. Bach probably wrote the bass lines for the others, and possibly modified some of the melodies.
