= Georg Christian Schemelli =

German church musician and publisher of a famous song book

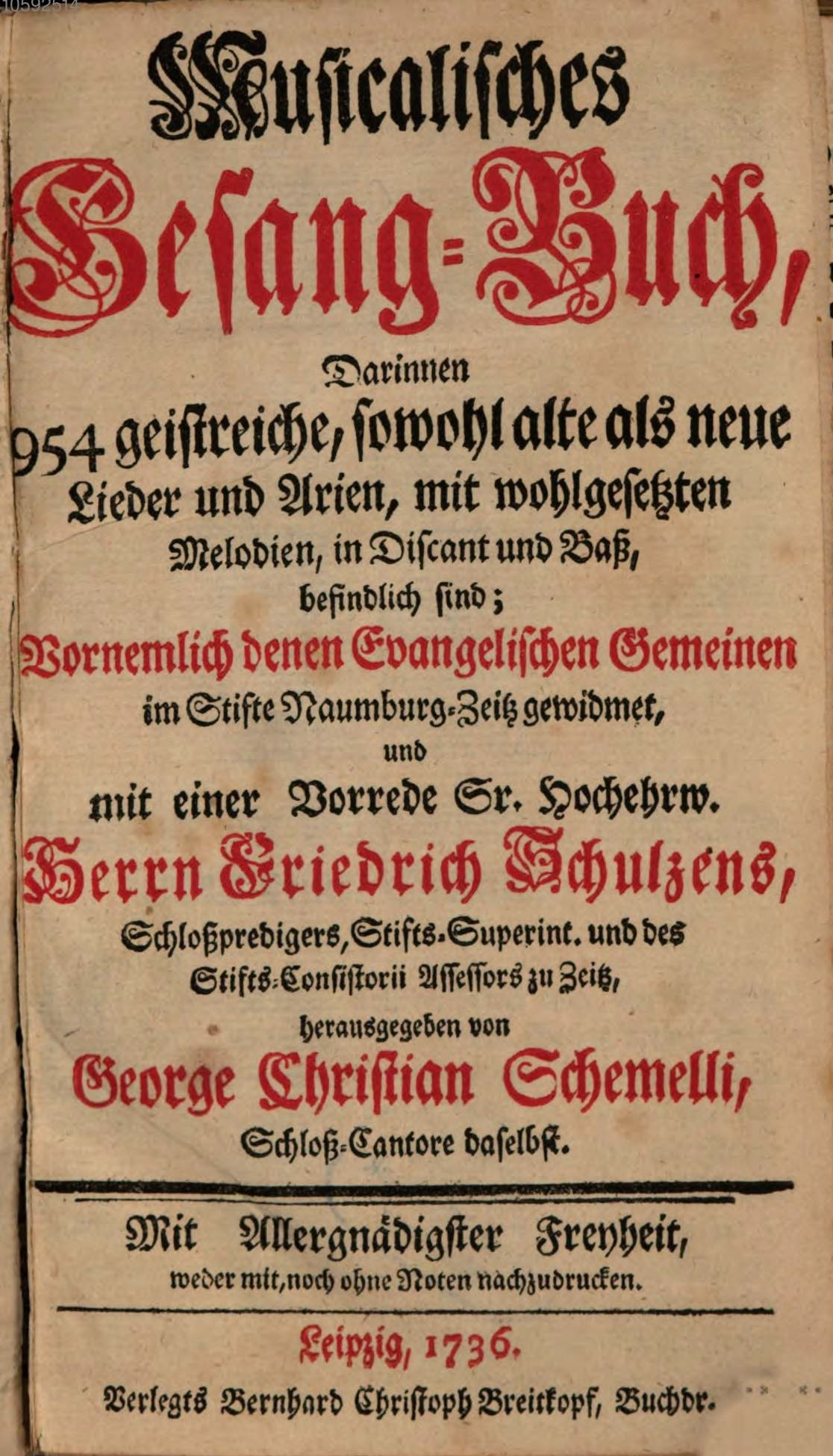
Title page of Schemelli's Musicalisches Gesang-Buch

Georg Christian Schemelli (born 1676 or 1678 or 1680 – 5 March 1762) was a German Protestant church musician. He is known for the publication Musicalisches Gesang-Buch, a collection of sacred songs to which Johann Sebastian Bach contributed.

Born in Herzberg, Schemelli was from 1695 to 1700 a student at the Thomasschule in Leipzig. From 1707, he held the position of church musician in Treuenbrietzen. From 1727 he was Hofkantor at the court of Zeitz, retiring in 1758. He died in Zeitz.

== Musicalisches Gesang-Buch ==
In 1736, Schemelli published in Leipzig his Musicalisches Gesang-Buch (Musical song book), also known as Schemellis Gesangbuch, a collection of 954 sacred songs with texts in the tradition of pietism. Only 69 of the songs come with music, a melody and a bass line.

Bach contributed to the collection, but musicologists debate to what extent. Schemelli's son Christian Friedrich was a student of the Thomasschule from 1733 to 1735, and later studied at the Leipzig University, which explains the contact. In the Bach-Werke-Verzeichnis (BWV), numbers 439 to 507 list songs from the Gesangbuch, but his authorship is certain only for three of them, "Dir, dir Jehovah, will ich singen", BWV 452, "Komm, süßer Tod", BWV 478, and "Vergiss mein nicht, vergiss mein nicht", BWV 505.
