= Song of Songs 7 =

Seventh chapter of the Song of Songs

- ← chapter 6 chapter 8 →
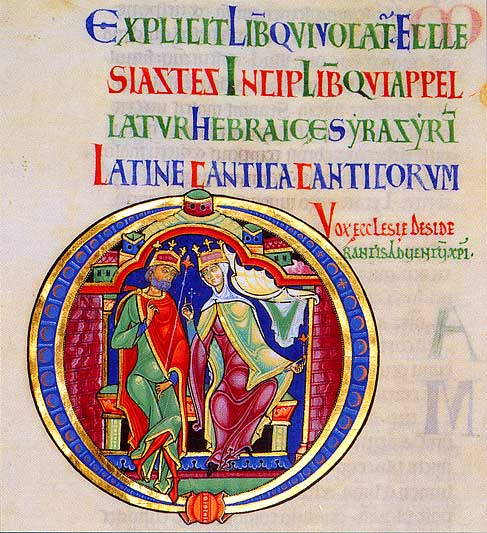
- Capital from the Song of Solomon in Winchester Cathedral.
- Book: Song of Songs
- Category: Ketuvim
- Christian Bible part: Old Testament
- Order in the Christian part: 22

Song of Songs 7 is the seventh chapter of the Song of Songs in the Hebrew Bible or the Old Testament of the Christian Bible. This book is one of the Five Megillot, a collection of short books, together with Ruth, Lamentations, Ecclesiastes and Esther, within the Ketuvim, the third and the last part of the Hebrew Bible. Jewish tradition views Solomon as the author of this book (although this is now largely disputed), and this attribution influences the acceptance of this book as a canonical text.

This chapter contains a poem in which the man describes the woman, his lover, and one or more songs in the woman's voice issued as invitations to the man.

== Text ==
The original text is written in Hebrew language. This chapter is divided into 13 verses.

=== Textual witnesses ===
Some early manuscripts containing the text of this chapter in Hebrew are of the Masoretic Text, which includes the Codex Leningradensis (1008). (Note: Since 1947 the current text of Aleppo Codex is missing Song of Songs 3:11, after the word ציון ("Zion"), to the end.) Some fragments containing parts of this chapter were found among the Dead Sea Scrolls: 4Q106 (4QCant^{a}); 30 BCE-30 CE; extant verses 1–7).

There is also a translation into Koine Greek known as the Septuagint, made in the last few centuries BCE. Extant ancient manuscripts of the Septuagint version include Codex Vaticanus (B; $\mathfrak{G}$^{B}; 4th century), Codex Sinaiticus (S; BHK: $\mathfrak{G}$^{S}; 4th century), and Codex Alexandrinus (A; $\mathfrak{G}$^{A}; 5th century).

== Structure ==
The Modern English Version (MEV) identifies the speakers in this chapter as:

- Song 7:1–9 = The Man (continuing from Song of Songs 6:13b)
- Song 7:10–13 = The Woman (continuing to Song of Songs 8:4)

Biblical scholar Athalya Brenner notes that verses 1 to 10 are "probably in a male voice", and 11 to 14 in a female voice. However, Andrew Harper argues that the opening verses (verses 1 to 6) contain the praises sung by "the ladies of the hareem".

== Male: Third descriptive poem for the female (7:1-9; [Masoretic 7:2-10]) ==
A voice, likely of the man, calling to the woman ("the Shulammite" in Song 6:13) to dance, then describing her body from toe to head in a poem or "waṣf" (verses 2–7), closing with a response indicating male desire (verses 8–9), which is followed perhaps by a "female retort" (verse 10) to round off this passage. This descriptive poem by the man still belongs to a long section concerning the desire and love in the country which continues until 8:4. The man's waṣf and the other ones (4:1-8; 5:10-16; 6:4-10) theologically demonstrate the heart of the Song that values the body as not evil but good even worthy of praise, and respects the body with an appreciative focus (rather than lurid). Hess notes that this reflects 'the fundamental value of God's creation as good and the human body as a key part of that creation, whether at the beginning (Genesis 1:26–28) or redeemed in the resurrection (1 Corinthians 15:42, 44)'.

=== Verse 5 ===
Your head crowns like Carmel,

and your flowing hair is like purple;
a king is held captive in the tresses.

- "Tresses" (KJV: "galleries"): from Hebrew: רהטים, rə-hā-ṭîm, is only found here in the Bible. Marvin H. Pope describes how it may have developed from a root rhṭ (known from Aramaic in the sense of "to run") used in connection with water (cf. Genesis 30:38, 41: Exodus 2:16), here as "the coursing of water" evoking the idea of "flowing hair".

== Female: Springtime and love (7:10–13; [Masoretic 7:11–14]) ==
In this section, one song (or several songs) in a female voice, seductively invites the man to go outdoors where the woman will give herself to him (cf. 4:9-14). The invitation contains a play on words based on the man's earlier expressions, such as "grape blossoms" in verse 12, which is related to 2:11–13, and "to see if the vines had blossomed, if pomegranates bloomed" in verse 12, which can be related to 5:11–12.

=== Verse 10 ===
I am my beloved's, and his desire is toward me.

Although similar to the line in Song 2:16 and Song 6:3, here the mutual belonging to each other is not expressed, and instead, the woman refers to the previous expression of desire of the man to her, while confirming that she belongs to him ("I am my beloved's").

=== Verse 13 ===
The mandrakes give forth fragrance,

and at our doors are all choice fruits,

new as well as old,

which I have laid up for you, my beloved.

- A "mandrake" in the ancient Near East was known "as an aid of fertility and as an aphodisiac" (Genesis 30:14–19).

== See also ==
- Bathrabbim
- Carmel
- Damascus
- Heshbon
- Lebanon
- Related Bible parts: Song of Songs 6

== Sources ==
- Assis, Elie (2009). Flashes of Fire: A Literary Analysis of the Song of Songs. T & T Clark. ISBN 9780567027641.
- Bergant, Dianne (2001). Cotter, David W.; Walsh, Jerome T.; Franke, Chris (eds.). The Songs of Songs. Berit Olam (The Everlasting Covenant): Studies In Hebrew Narrative And Poetry. Liturgical Press. ISBN 9780814650691.
- Brenner, Athalya (2007). "21. The Song of Solomon". In Barton, John; Muddiman, John (eds.). The Oxford Bible Commentary (first (paperback) ed.). Oxford University Press. pp. 429–433. ISBN 978-0199277186.
- Coogan, Michael David (2007). Coogan, Michael David; Brettler, Marc Zvi; Newsom, Carol Ann; Perkins, Pheme (eds.). The New Oxford Annotated Bible with the Apocryphal/Deuterocanonical Books: New Revised Standard Version, Issue 48 (Augmented 3rd ed.). Oxford University Press. ISBN 9780195288810.
- Exum, J. Cheryl (2005). Songs of Songs: A Commentary. Old Testament library (reprint ed.). Westminster John Knox Press. ISBN 9780664221904.
- Halley, Henry H. (1965). Halley's Bible Handbook: an abbreviated Bible commentary (24th (revised) ed.). Zondervan Publishing House. ISBN 0-310-25720-4.
- Hess, Richard S. (2005). Songs of Songs. Baker Commentary on the Old Testament Series. Baker Academic. ISBN 9780801027123.
- Longman, Tremper (2001). Songs of Songs. The New International Commentary on the Old Testament. Vol. 26. Wm. B. Eerdmans Publishing. ISBN 9780802825438.
- Würthwein, Ernst (1995). The Text of the Old Testament. Translated by Rhodes, Erroll F. Grand Rapids, MI: Wm. B. Eerdmans. ISBN 0-8028-0788-7.
