= Song of Songs 6 =

Sixth chapter of the Song of Songs

- ← chapter 5 chapter 7 →
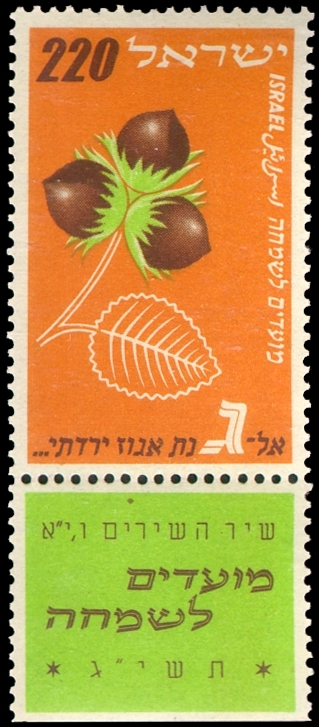
- Inscription "I went down into the garden of nuts" and on tab: "Song of Solomon 6:11", "Joyous Festivals 5713" stamp - 220 mil.
- Book: Song of Songs
- Category: Ketuvim
- Christian Bible part: Old Testament
- Order in the Christian part: 22

Song of Songs 6 (abbreviated as Song 6) is the sixth chapter of the Song of Songs in the Hebrew Bible or the Old Testament of the Christian Bible. This book is one of the Five Megillot, a collection of short books, together with Ruth, Lamentations, Ecclesiastes and Esther, within the Ketuvim, the third and the last part of the Hebrew Bible. Jewish tradition views Solomon as the author of this book (although this is now largely disputed), and this attribution influences the acceptance of this book as a canonical text. This chapter contains a dialogue between the daughters of Jerusalem and the woman about the man, followed by the man's descriptive poem of the woman, ending with a collective call to the woman to return.

== Text ==
The original text is written in Hebrew. This chapter is divided into 13 verses.

=== Textual witnesses ===
Some early manuscripts containing the text of this chapter in Hebrew are of the Masoretic Text, which includes the Codex Leningradensis (1008). (Note: Since 1947 the current text of Aleppo Codex is missing Song of Songs 3:11, after the word ציון ("Zion"), to the end.) Some fragments containing parts of this chapter were found among the Dead Sea Scrolls: 4Q106 (4QCant^{a}); 30 BCE-30 CE; extant verses 11(?)-12).

There is also a translation into Koine Greek known as the Septuagint, made in the last few centuries BCE. Extant ancient manuscripts of the Septuagint version include Codex Vaticanus (B; $\mathfrak{G}$^{B}; 4th century), Codex Sinaiticus (S; BHK: $\mathfrak{G}$^{S}; 4th century), and Codex Alexandrinus (A; $\mathfrak{G}$^{A}; 5th century).

== Structure ==
The Modern English Version (MEV) identifies the speakers in this chapter as:

- Song 6:1 = Friends of the Woman
- Song 6:2–3 = The Woman
- Song 6:4–12 = The Man
- Song 6:13a = Friends of the Woman
- Song 6:13b = The Man

== Chorus: Inquiry for the male (6:1) ==
Continuing from chapter 5, the daughters of Jerusalem agree to look for the man.

=== Verse 1 ===
Where has your beloved gone,

O fairest among women?

Where has your beloved turned aside,

that we may seek him with you?

The words in this verse parallel those in Song 5:9.

== Female: Reunites with her lover (6:2-3) ==
This part contains the woman's affirmation of her love, when she finds him enjoying his garden.

=== Verse 2 ===
My beloved is gone down into his garden, to the beds of spices, to feed in the gardens, and to gather lilies.

This could be related to Ecclesiastes 2:5, 6 where Solomon says, "I planted me vineyards; I made me gardens and parks, and I planted trees in them of all kinds of fruit; I made me pools of water, to water therefrom the forest where trees were reared." Franz Delitzsch suggests that she locates him in the garden because this is where he is inclined to spend his time, "where he delights most to tarry".

=== Verse 3 ===
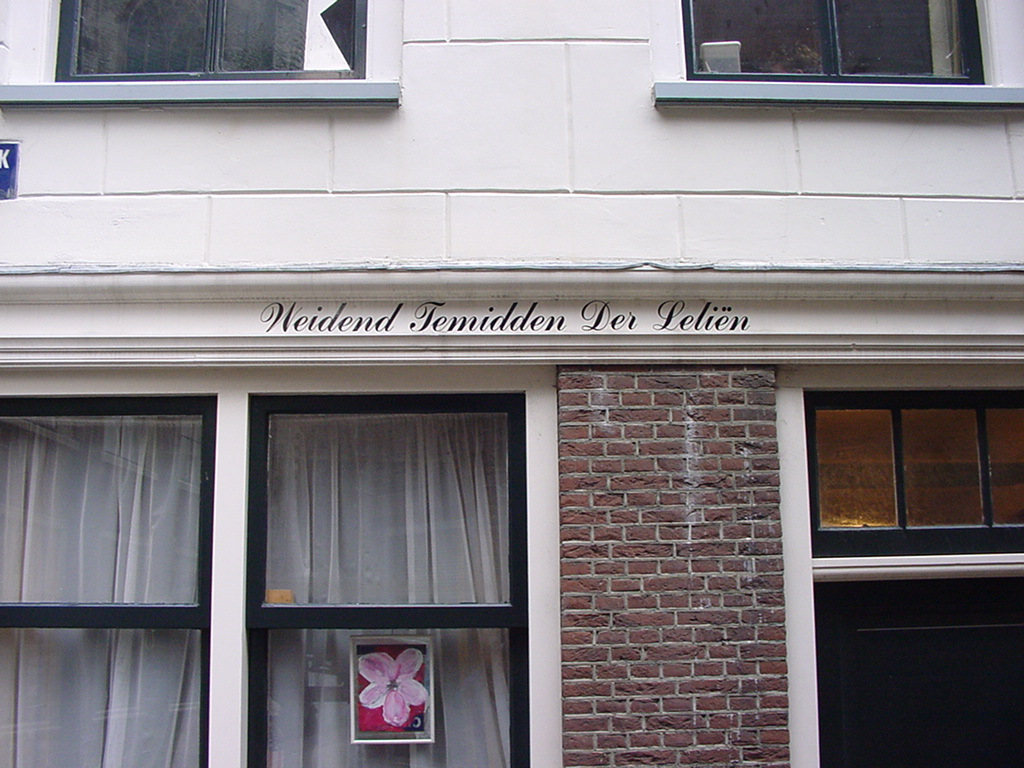
A text from Song 6:3 in Dutch (English: "Feedeth among the lilies"), on a house in Leiden, the Netherlands.

I am my beloved's, and my beloved is mine: he feedeth among the lilies.

In reversed order compared to Song 2:16. He feeds his flock among the lilies: reference to the flock is added in the New King James Version and other texts.

== Male: Second descriptive poem for the female (6:4-10) ==
This descriptive poem by the man still belongs to a long section concerning the desire and love in the country which continues until 8:4, and partly parallel to the one in chapter 4. The man's waṣf and the other ones (4:1-8; 5:10-16; 7:1-9) theologically demonstrate the heart of the Song that values the body as not evil but good even worthy of praise, and respects the body with an appreciative focus (rather than lurid). Hess notes that this reflects 'the fundamental value of God's creation as good and the human body as a key part of that creation, whether at the beginning (Genesis 1:26–28) or redeemed in the resurrection (1 Corinthians 15:42, 44)'.

=== Verse 4 ===
You are beautiful as Tirzah, my love,

comely as Jerusalem,
awesome as an army with banners!

- Tirzah: the capital of the Kingdom of Northern Israel in the late 10th and early 9th BCE; likely identified with Tell el-Farah North.
- "My love" (or "my [female] friend"; Hebrew: רעיתי, ra‘-yā-ṯî) a specific term of endearment used by the man for the woman that is used 9 times in the book (Song 1:9, 15; 2:2,10, 13; 4:1,7; 5:2; 6:4). The masculine form of the same root word to call the man ("my [male] friend"; Hebrew: רעי, rê-‘î) (Note: Another use of rê·‘î in the Hebrew Bible is in Job 31:9.) is used in a parallel construction with "my beloved" (Hebrew: דודי, ḏōḏî) in Song 5:16.

== Female: Lingering in the groves (6:11-12) ==
The woman's voice in this part contains ambiguity in the meaning of some words, that poses difficulty in assigning it to either of the main speakers (NIV assigns this part to the man).

=== Verse 11 ===
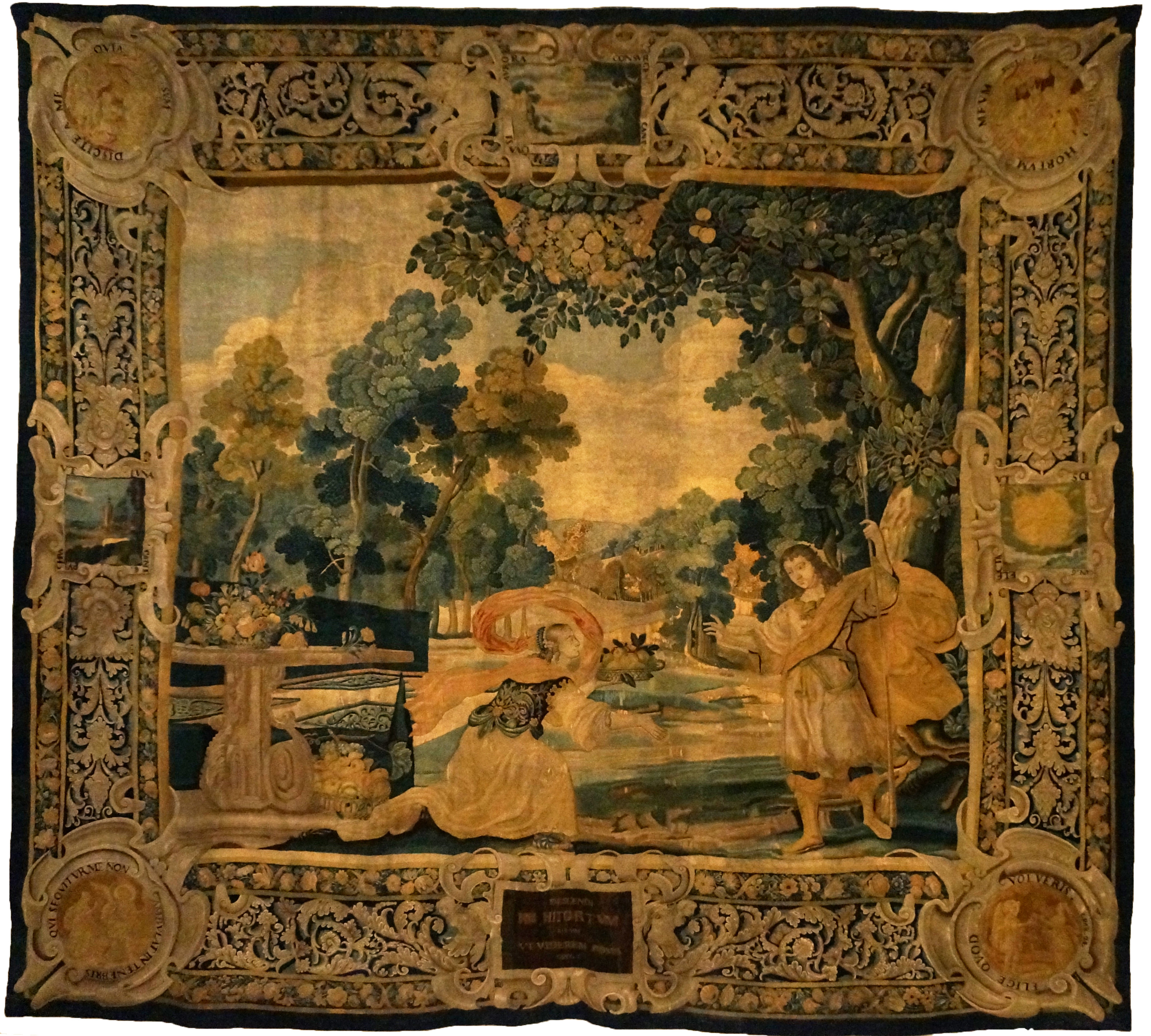
French tapestry with the text of Song 6:11 in Latin (English: "I went down into the garden of nuts"). Palais du Tau, Reims, Hauteville, Aisne (17th century).

I went down into the garden of nuts to see the fruits of the valley, and to see whether the vine flourished and the pomegranates budded.

- "Nuts" (Hebrew: אֱגוֹז, ’ĕ-ḡōz): only found here in Hebrew Bible, but more in the Talmud; may specifically refer to the walnut tree (Juglans regia).

=== Verse 12 ===
Or ever I was aware, my soul made me like the chariots of Amminadib.

- "Amminadib": or "my noble people". The Septuagint and Vulgate, as in the King James Bible refer this last part of the verse to an individual named Amminadib (or variant spelling "Aminadab"). K. Froehlich notes that "Amminadab's chariot" was interpreted as a four-horse chariot or quadriga during the Middle Ages, and considered 'a cipher for the fourfold meaning and interpretation of Scripture'.

== Chorus: Call to return (6:13) ==
This verse does not indicate clearly who the speaker is, but there must be either multiple persons concerned in it or a quotation, because 'there is an evident interchange of question and answer'.

=== Verse 13 ===
[Friends of the Woman]

Return, return, O Shulammite!

Return, return, that we may look upon you.

[The Man]

Why should you look upon the Shulammite,

as upon a dance before two armies?

- "Shulammite": The name for the bride which only occurs here in the whole book, but 'it cannot be a proper name, otherwise even in the vocative there would be no article, as there is here', so it can be interpreted as 'maiden of Shulam' (cf. the Shunammite, 1 Kings 1:3). It could be how the courtiers call her, not knowing her true name, so they use 'the name of the village near which they were when they saw her'.
- "A dance before two armies" (KJV: "the company of two armies"): or "dance of Mahanaim".

== See also ==
- Jerusalem
- Lebanon
- Related Bible parts: Song of Songs 5

== Sources ==
- Bergant, Dianne (2001). Cotter, David W.; Walsh, Jerome T.; Franke, Chris (eds.). The Songs of Songs. Berit Olam (The Everlasting Covenant): Studies In Hebrew Narrative And Poetry. Liturgical Press. ISBN 9780814650691.
- Brenner, Athalya (2007). "21. The Song of Solomon". In Barton, John; Muddiman, John (eds.). The Oxford Bible Commentary (first (paperback) ed.). Oxford University Press. pp. 429–433. ISBN 978-0199277186.
- Coogan, Michael David (2007). Coogan, Michael David; Brettler, Marc Zvi; Newsom, Carol Ann; Perkins, Pheme (eds.). The New Oxford Annotated Bible with the Apocryphal/Deuterocanonical Books: New Revised Standard Version, Issue 48 (Augmented 3rd ed.). Oxford University Press. ISBN 9780195288810.
- Exum, J. Cheryl (2005). Songs of Songs: A Commentary. Old Testament library (reprint ed.). Westminster John Knox Press. ISBN 9780664221904.
- Halley, Henry H. (1965). Halley's Bible Handbook: an abbreviated Bible commentary (24th (revised) ed.). Zondervan Publishing House. ISBN 0-310-25720-4.
- Hess, Richard S. (2005). Songs of Songs. Baker Commentary on the Old Testament Series. Baker Academic. ISBN 9780801027123.
- Longman, Tremper (2001). Songs of Songs. The New International Commentary on the Old Testament. Vol. 26. Wm. B. Eerdmans Publishing. ISBN 9780802825438.
- Würthwein, Ernst (1995). The Text of the Old Testament. Translated by Rhodes, Erroll F. Grand Rapids, MI: Wm. B. Eerdmans. ISBN 0-8028-0788-7.
