= Song of Songs 4 =

Fourth chapter of the Song of Songs

- ← chapter 3 chapter 5 →
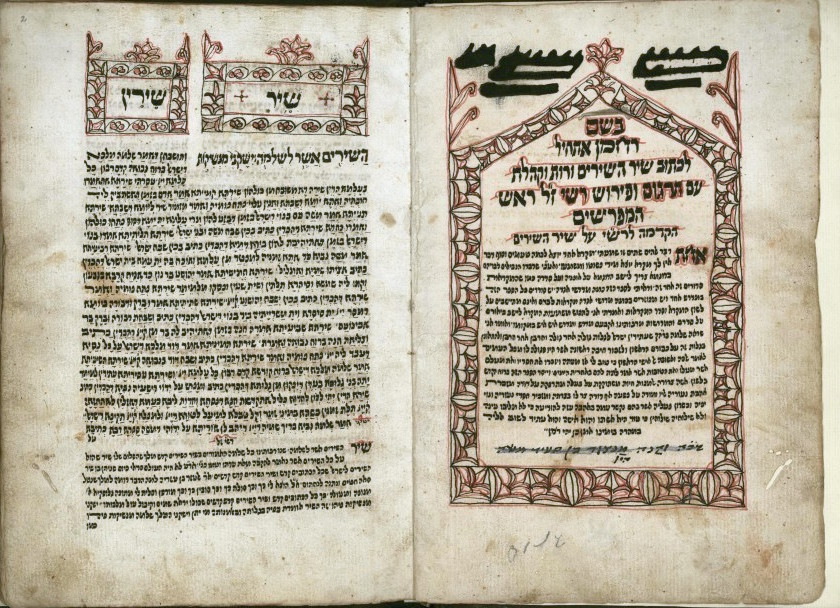
- A page of Rashi's interpretation of the megillot (the left page is about the Song of Songs)
- Book: Song of Songs
- Category: Ketuvim
- Christian Bible part: Old Testament
- Order in the Christian part: 22

Song of Songs 4 (abbreviated as Song 4) is the fourth chapter of the Song of Songs in the Hebrew Bible or the Old Testament of the Christian Bible. This book is one of the Five Megillot, a collection of short books, together with Ruth, Lamentations, Ecclesiastes and Esther, within the Ketuvim, the third and the last part of the Hebrew Bible. Jewish tradition views Solomon as the author of this book (although this is now largely disputed), and this attribution influences the acceptance of this book as a canonical text. This chapter contains the man's descriptive poem of the woman's body and the invitation to be together which is accepted by the woman.

== Text ==
The original text is written in Hebrew language. This chapter is divided into 16 verses.

Some early manuscripts containing the text of this chapter in Hebrew are of the Masoretic Text, which includes the Codex Leningradensis (1008). (Note: Since 1947 the current text of Aleppo Codex is missing Song of Songs 3:11, after the word ציון ("Zion"), to the end.) Some fragments containing parts of this chapter were found among the Dead Sea Scrolls: 4Q106 (4QCant^{a}); 30 BCE-30 CE; extant verses 1–7), and 4Q107 (4QCant^{b}); 30 BCE-30 CE; extant verses 1–3, 8–11, 14–16).

There is also a translation into Koine Greek known as the Septuagint, made in the last few centuries BCE. Extant ancient manuscripts of the Septuagint version include Codex Vaticanus (B; $\mathfrak{G}$^{B}; 4th century), Codex Sinaiticus (S; BHK: $\mathfrak{G}$^{S}; 4th century), and Codex Alexandrinus (A; $\mathfrak{G}$^{A}; 5th century).

== Structure ==
The Modern English Version (MEV), along with other translations, sees verses 1 to 15 as the words of the man, and verse 16 as the words of the woman. Athalya Brenner treats verses 1 to 7 as the man's waṣf or descriptive poem, and verse 8 to 5:1 as a dialogue between the male and female lovers.

== Analysis ==
=== Male: First descriptive poem and call to come along (verses 1-8) ===
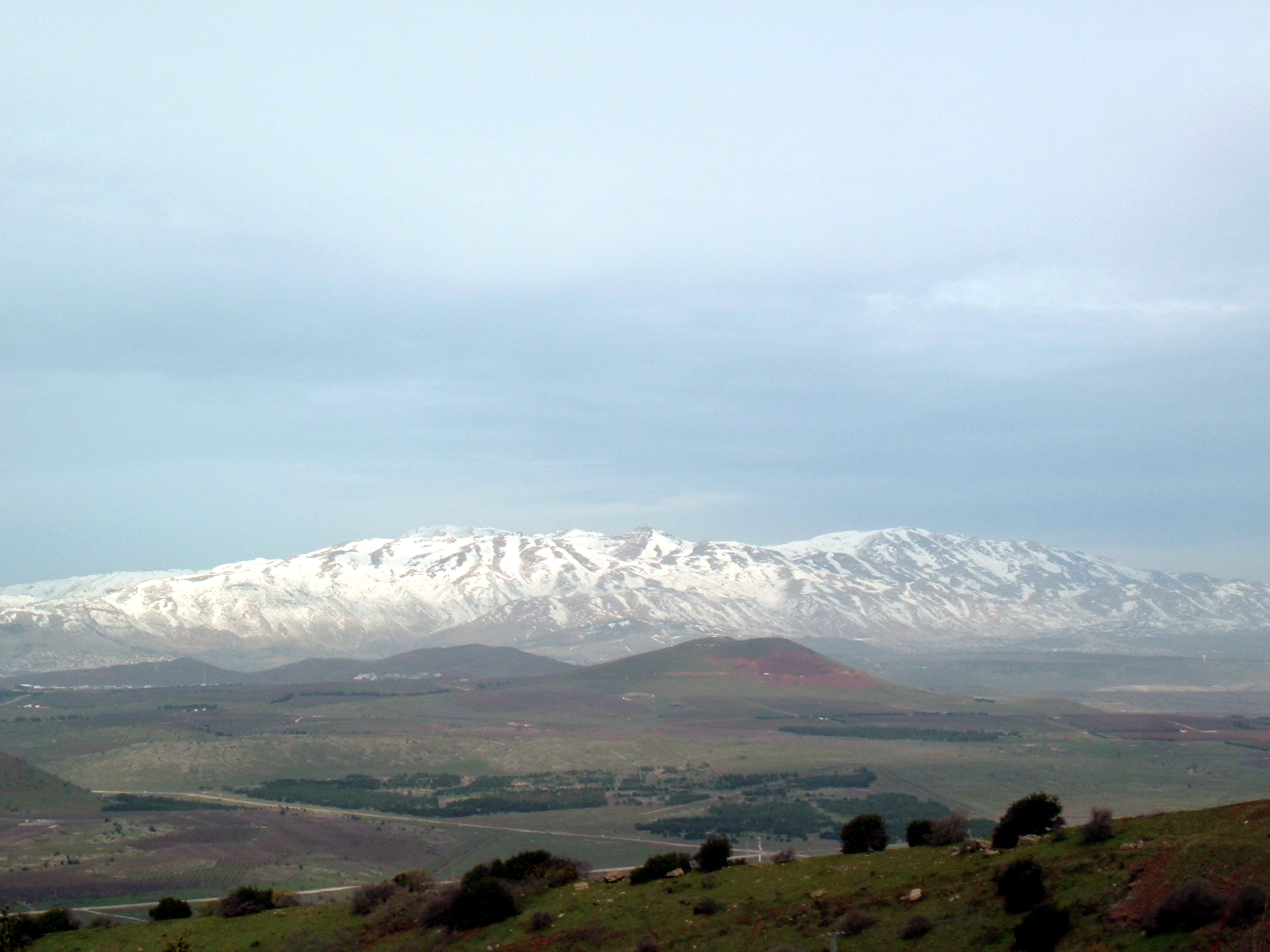
Mount Hermon, highest point in the Anti-Lebanon range, looking north from Mount Bental in the Golan Heights.

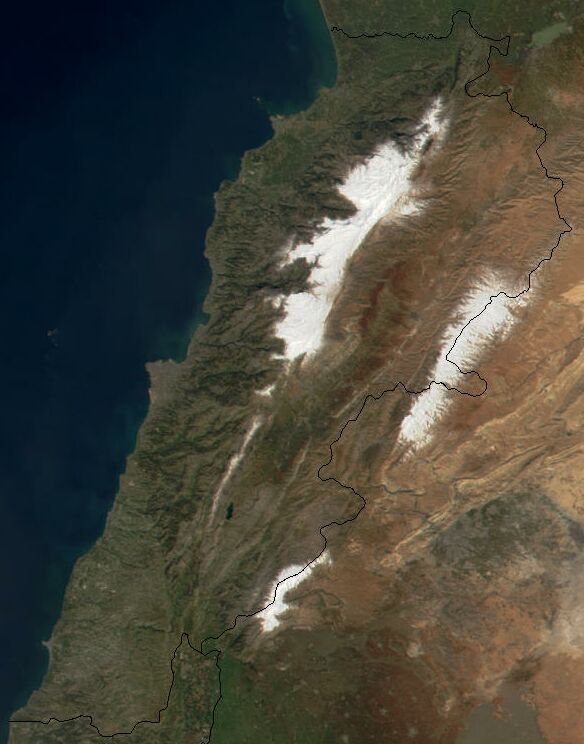
Satellite image of Lebanon. The snow-covered areas nearer the coast are the Mount Lebanon range and the snow-covered areas further inland are the Anti-Lebanon mountain range.

The beginning (verse 1a) and the end (verse 8a) of this part contain repeated lines that "frame an address of endearment": "my darling/[my] bride." Verses 1-7 contain the man's waṣf or descriptive poem of his female lover from head to breast, using imagery of flora and fauna, with a few of "fortifications and military weapons". Verses 2 and 5 begin and end this imagery with comparisons with animals, such as sheep and fawns, whereas verses 6-8 focus on the desire of the male speaker to visit "the mountain of myrrh" and to be joined there by his partner, expressing his desire in terms of a sensual pursuit with his lover's body as a mountain on which he finds perfumes. Verse 7 concludes with a summary statement of the woman's perfection and invitation to his bride to 'come away from the impregnable heights and to join him'.

This waṣf and the later ones (5:10-16; 6:4-10; 7:1-9) demonstrate theologically the heart of the Song, which values the body as not evil but good, even worthy of praise, and respects the body with an appreciative focus (rather than lurid). Hess notes that this reflects "the fundamental value of God's creation as good and the human body as a key part of that creation, whether at the beginning (Genesis 1:26–28) or redeemed in the resurrection (1 Corinthians 15:42, 44)". While verse 7a is in parallel with verse 1a, forming an inclusio as well as a sense of closure to this part of the poem, verse 7b follows the positive assertion of the woman's beauty with a more negative assertion that "she has no blemish or defect" (mûm; referring to physical imperfection; cf. the use in the sacrificial ritual, Leviticus 22:20–21, 25: Deuteronomy 17:1), which is similar to the references to Absalom (2 Samuel 14:25) and to Daniel and his three friends in the court of Nebuchadnezzar (Daniel 1:4).

==== Verse 4 ====
Thy neck is like the tower of David builded for an armoury, whereon there hang a thousand bucklers, all shields of mighty men.

- "Tower of David": the actual tower is unknown.
- "Bucklers": small shields. The image of the shields and bucklers describe the necklace around the neck of the woman.

==== Verse 6 ====
Until the day breaks and the shadows flee, I will go to the mountain of myrrh and to the hill of incense.

The mountain of myrrh and the hill of incense represent the site of the Temple in Jerusalem, with "myrrh" (mor in Hebrew) reflecting the Mountain of Moriah, where Solomon built his temple.

==== Verse 7 ====
Thou art all fair, my love; there is no spot in thee.

- "There is no spot": this description is used for the bride of Christ, who is depicted as "not having spot, or wrinkle, or any such thing" (Ephesians 5:27 KJV).

==== Verse 8 ====
Come with me from Lebanon, my spouse, with me from Lebanon: look from the top of Amana, from the top of Shenir and Hermon, from the lions' dens, from the mountains of the leopards.

This verse depicts the danger and the woman's inaccessibility (cf. Song 2:14). The man is asking his bride not to go with him to Lebanon but to come with him from Lebanon, which is a 'figurative allusion to the general unapproachableness' of the woman. Verse 8b contains two parallel expressions that frame the central expression "from Hermon":

Travel

from the peak of Amana,
from the peak of Senir,

from Hermon,

from the dens of lions
from the mountain lairs of leopards.

A similar structure in verse 7 forms together the twin centers of "my darling" and "from Mount Hermon", which beautifully summarize the concern of the man for access to his bride.

- "Lebanon": located north of Israel in modern-day Lebanon and Syria; Amana, Shenir (or Senir) and Hermon are the names of individual peaks in the Anti-Lebanon mountain ranges.
- "Spouse" or "bride" together with "sister" (Song 4:9–10, 12; 5:1) are terms of affection.

=== Male: A walk in the garden (verses 9-15) ===
This section is a part of a dialogue concerning "seduction and consummation" (up to 5:1), where here the man seduces the woman, with extravagant imagery of food and flowers/herbs.

==== Verse 9 ====
Thou hast ravished my heart, my sister, my spouse; thou hast ravished my heart with one of thine eyes, with one chain of thy neck.

"Thou hast ravished my heart" (Hebrew: לִבַּבְתִּנִי, Libavtini) is the verb form of the noun for heart, לבב, and literally means "thou has hearted me." This exact form of the word (pi`el perfect) appears only once in the bible, within this verse.

As it comes in the context of a dialogue between two lovers, most translations have given it a meaning of stolen my heart: "You have captivated my heart" (English Standard Version), "Thou hast ravished my heart" (King James Version), "You have made my heart beat faster" (New American Standard Bible), "You have carried my heart away!" (The Complete Jewish Bible), "You have charmed me" (God's Word Translation), "You have thrilled my heart" (New Century Version), "Thou hast wounded my heart" (Douay-Rheims Catholic Bible), and "Thou hast emboldened me" (Young's Literal Translation).

Traditional Jewish commentators have also given the word "Libavtini" similar interpretations.

- Aramaic Targum: your love is fixed or established upon my heart.
- Rashi: you have drawn my heart to you.
- Ibn Ezra: you have cut off my heart (similar to pruning a branch).

There are two other locations in the bible with the verb form of the root לִ-בַּ-בְ:

- Job 11:12: "Shall an empty man get a mind (Hebrew: יִלָּבֵב) or a wild ass's colt be born a man (?)." In this verse, the verb form of the word heart takes on a meaning of "get a mind" or "get a heart" - this is because the heart represented in the bible the whole inner world of humans, including both emotions and thoughts. This meaning would be similar to translations of libavtini as "you have rekindled my heart" or "given me a heart".
- 2 Samuel 13:8: "And she took dough, and kneaded it, and made cakes (Hebrew: וַתְּלַבֵּ֣ב) in his sight". In this verse, we see similarities between the ideas of "nourish" in the form of making cakes and the concept of "heartening" someone.

"Thou hast ravished my heart with one of thine eyes." There could be both literal and figurative interpretations of this sentence. Figuratively, the man expresses how just a fraction of the woman's personality and appearance is sufficient to capture his heart. Literally, this could mean that the woman has only one of her eyes visible. She could be winking, or perhaps, she is looking at the man herself from a hiding spot and only one of her eyes is visible as she peers at him.

==== Verse 14 ====
Spikenard and saffron; calamus and cinnamon, with all trees of frankincense; myrrh and aloes, with all the chief spices:

- "Saffron, calamus, cinnamon" and "aloes" are spices from India.

=== Female: Invitation to her garden (verse 16) ===
The woman consents to the man's call (verses 9-15), leading to a closure in 5:1.

==== Verse 16b ====
The Vulgate version of the fourth chapter ends on "... et fluant aromata illius." (transl. "... that its spices may flow out.") The next phrase, "Veniat dilectus meus ..." (transl. Let my beloved come ...) opens the fifth chapter in the Vulgate version, while most other versions and translations open that chapter with the man's response ("I have come into my garden").

== See also ==
- Anti-Lebanon Mountains
- Lebanon
- Mount Amana
- Mount Gilead
- Mount Hermon
- Related Bible parts: Song of Songs 2

== Sources ==
- Bergant, Dianne (2001). Cotter, David W.; Walsh, Jerome T.; Franke, Chris (eds.). The Songs of Songs. Berit Olam (The Everlasting Covenant): Studies In Hebrew Narrative And Poetry. Liturgical Press. ISBN 9780814650691.
- Brenner, Athalya (2007). "21. The Song of Solomon". In Barton, John; Muddiman, John (eds.). The Oxford Bible Commentary (first (paperback) ed.). Oxford University Press. pp. 429–433. ISBN 978-0199277186.
- Coogan, Michael David (2007). Coogan, Michael David; Brettler, Marc Zvi; Newsom, Carol Ann; Perkins, Pheme (eds.). The New Oxford Annotated Bible with the Apocryphal/Deuterocanonical Books: New Revised Standard Version, Issue 48 (Augmented 3rd ed.). Oxford University Press. ISBN 9780195288810.
- Exum, J. Cheryl (2005). Songs of Songs: A Commentary. Old Testament library (reprint ed.). Westminster John Knox Press. ISBN 9780664221904.
- Halley, Henry H. (1965). Halley's Bible Handbook: an abbreviated Bible commentary (24th (revised) ed.). Zondervan Publishing House. ISBN 0-310-25720-4.
- Hess, Richard S. (2005). Songs of Songs. Baker Commentary on the Old Testament Series. Baker Academic. ISBN 9780801027123.
- Longman, Tremper (2001). Songs of Songs. The New International Commentary on the Old Testament. Vol. 26. Wm. B. Eerdmans Publishing. ISBN 9780802825438.
- Würthwein, Ernst (1995). The Text of the Old Testament. Translated by Rhodes, Erroll F. Grand Rapids, MI: Wm. B. Eerdmans. ISBN 0-8028-0788-7.
