= Song of Songs 1 =

First chapter of the Song of Songs

- ← Ecclesiastes 12 chapter 2 →
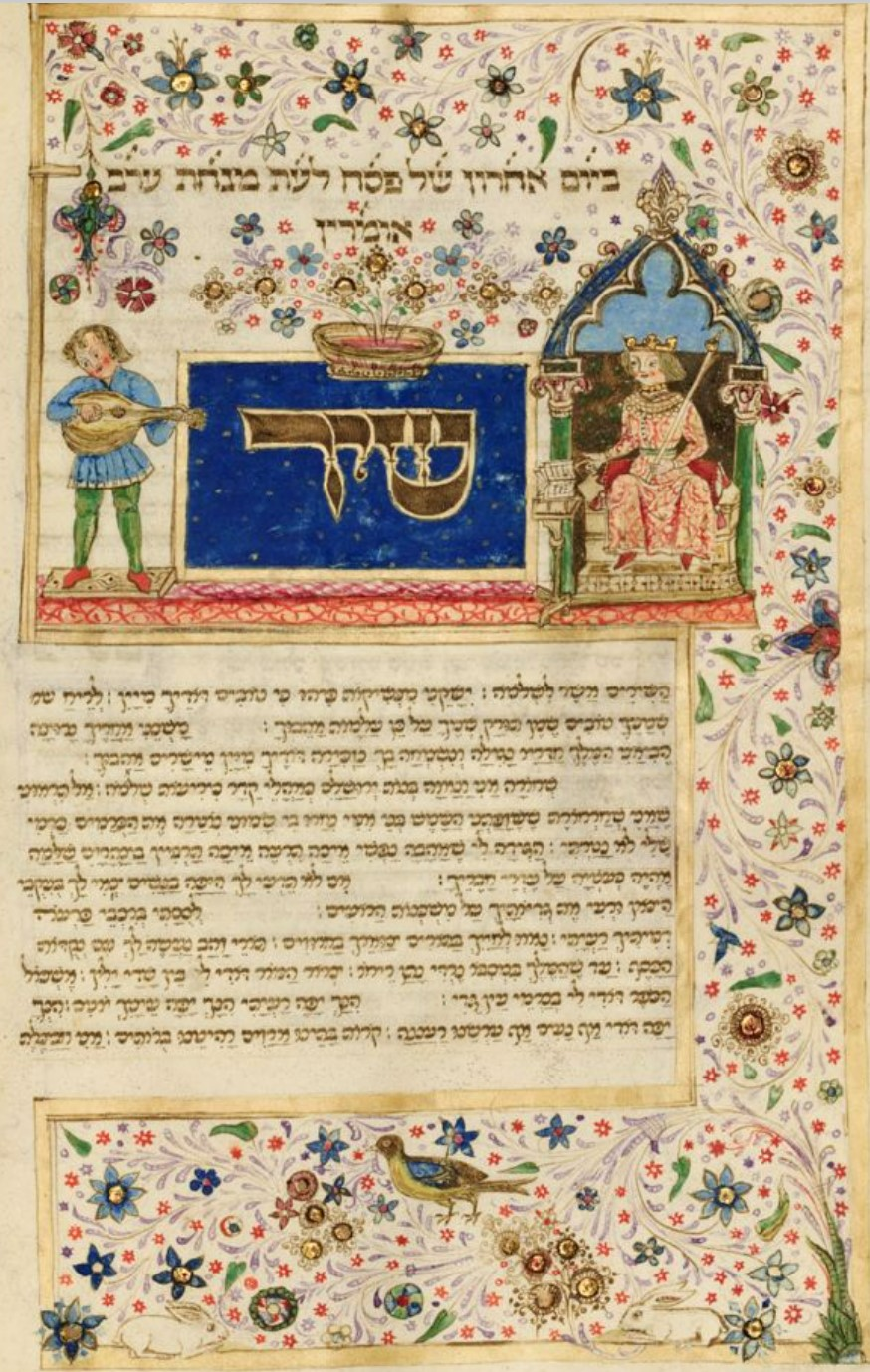
- Illumination for the opening verse of Song of Songs, the Rothschild Mahzor, Manuscript on parchment. Florence, Italy, 1492.
- Book: Song of Songs
- Category: Ketuvim
- Christian Bible part: Old Testament
- Order in the Christian part: 22

Song of Songs 1 (abbreviated as Song 1) is the first chapter of the "Song of Songs" or "Song of Solomon", a book of the Hebrew Bible or Old Testament of the Christian Bible. This book is one of the Five Megillot, a group of short books, together with Ruth, Lamentations, Ecclesiastes and Esther, within the Ketuvim, the third and the final section of the Hebrew Bible. Jewish tradition views Solomon as the author of this book (although this is now largely disputed), and this attribution influences the acceptance of this book as a canonical text. Song of Songs 1 contains the book's superscription, songs of the main female characters, and the opening song of the male character.

== Text ==
A handwritten Hebrew scroll of the Song of Songs by the scribe Elihu Shannon of Kibbutz Saad, Israel (circa 2005).

The original text is written in Hebrew language. The chapter is divided into 17 verses (16 in the Latin Vulgate translation).

=== Textual witnesses ===
Some early manuscripts containing the text of this chapter in Hebrew are of the Masoretic Text, including the Aleppo Codex (10th century CE), and Codex Leningradensis (CE 1008). Some fragments containing verses of Song 1 were found among the Dead Sea Scrolls, assigned as 6Q6 (6QCant); 50 CE; extant verses 1–7).

There is also a translation into Koine Greek known as the Septuagint, made in the last few centuries BCE. Extant ancient manuscripts of the Septuagint version include Codex Vaticanus (B; $\mathfrak{G}$^{B}; 4th century), Codex Sinaiticus (S; BHK: $\mathfrak{G}$^{S}; 4th century), and Codex Alexandrinus (A; $\mathfrak{G}$^{A}; 5th century).

== Structure ==
The Modern English Version (MEV) divides this chapter as follows:

- Song 1:1 = Introduction
- Song 1:2–4a = The Woman
- Song 1:4b = Friends of the Woman
- Song 1:5–7 = The Woman
- Song 1:8 = Friends of the Woman
- Song 1:9–10 = The Man
- Song 1:11 = Friends of the Woman
- Song 1:12–14 = The Woman
- Song 1:15 = The Man
- Song 1:16–17 = The Woman

The New Catholic Bible and Jerusalem Bible treat verses 2-4 as a "prologue". Richard Hess, on the other hand, treats verses 1:1-2:7 as a "prologue".

== Superscription (1:1) ==
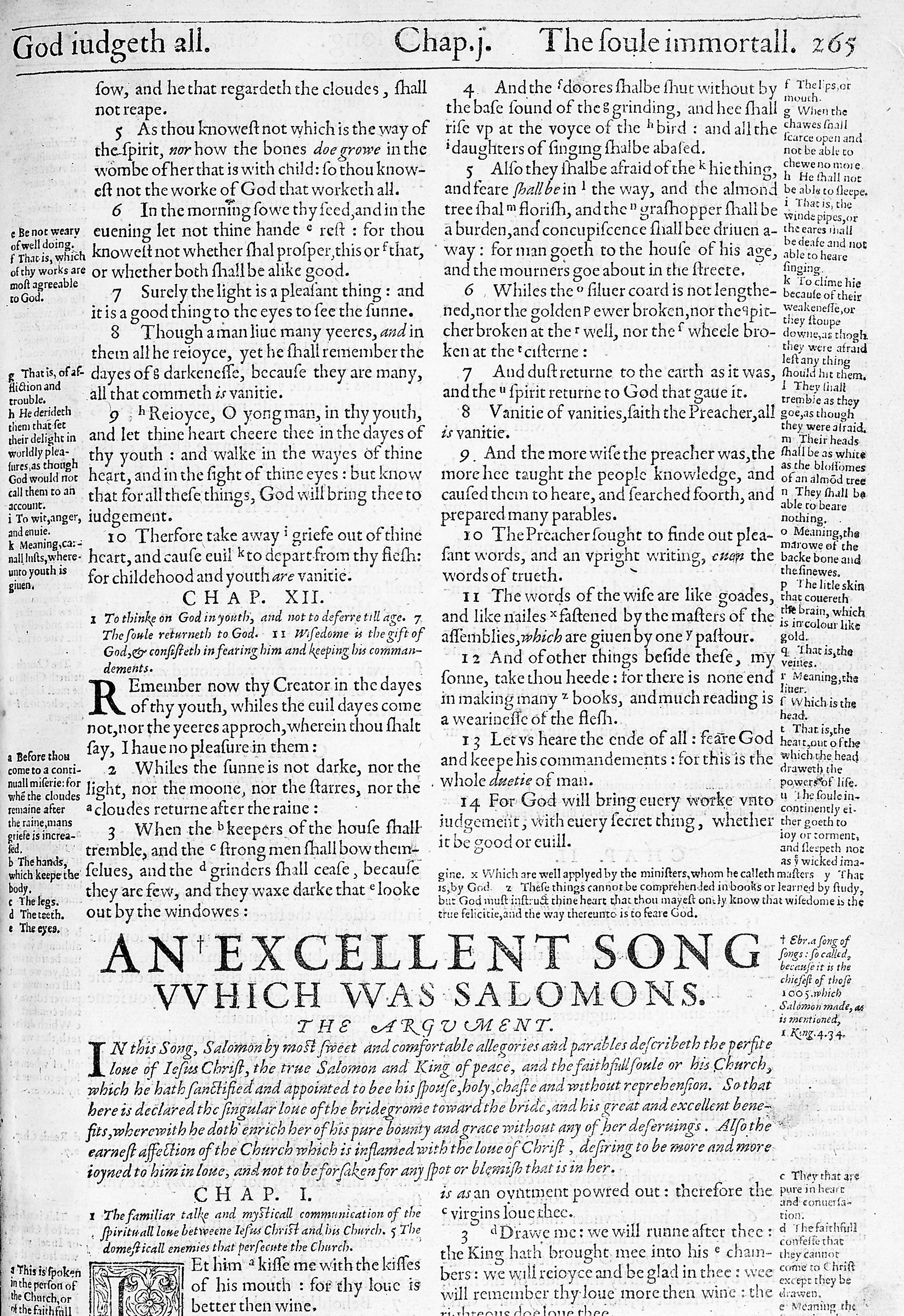
The end of the book of Ecclesiastes and the beginning of the first chapter of Song of Songs in a family Bible, bound with the Book of Common Prayer, 1607.

A superscription in a biblical book functions like the title page of a modern book, containing information about the genre, author, and sometimes also the subject matter and the date of the book (in prophecy books for examples, Isaiah 1:1; Nahum 1:1; in wisdom books: Proverbs 1:1; Ecclesiastes 1:1).

=== Verse 1 ===
The song of songs, which is Solomon's.

This verse is a detached description of the book's content, containing two phrases: "the song of songs" and "which is Solomon's".

- The "song of songs" (Hebrew: שיר השירים, shîr ha-shî-rîm): The form of the words indicates a superlative statement as the "Greatest of Songs", but can also denote "a single poem composed of many poems".
- "Song" (Hebrew: שיר, shîr; also meaning "poem") in noun form appears only here in this book, out of 166 times in the Hebrew Bible (mostly in the Book of Psalms).
- "Which is Solomon's" ("that concerns Solomon"; Hebrew: אשר לשלמה, ’ă-sher liš-lō-mōh): can have the interpretation that (1) Solomon is the author; (2) the book is dedicated to Solomon; or (3) it was merely a 'part of royal holding'.
- "Solomon" is mentioned twice in this chapter (verses 1 and 5); Solomon's name also appears in two other passages (3 times in 3:6–11 and twice in the final chapter 8:10–12), a total of seven times in the whole book.

== Female: Longing for her lover (1:2–7) ==
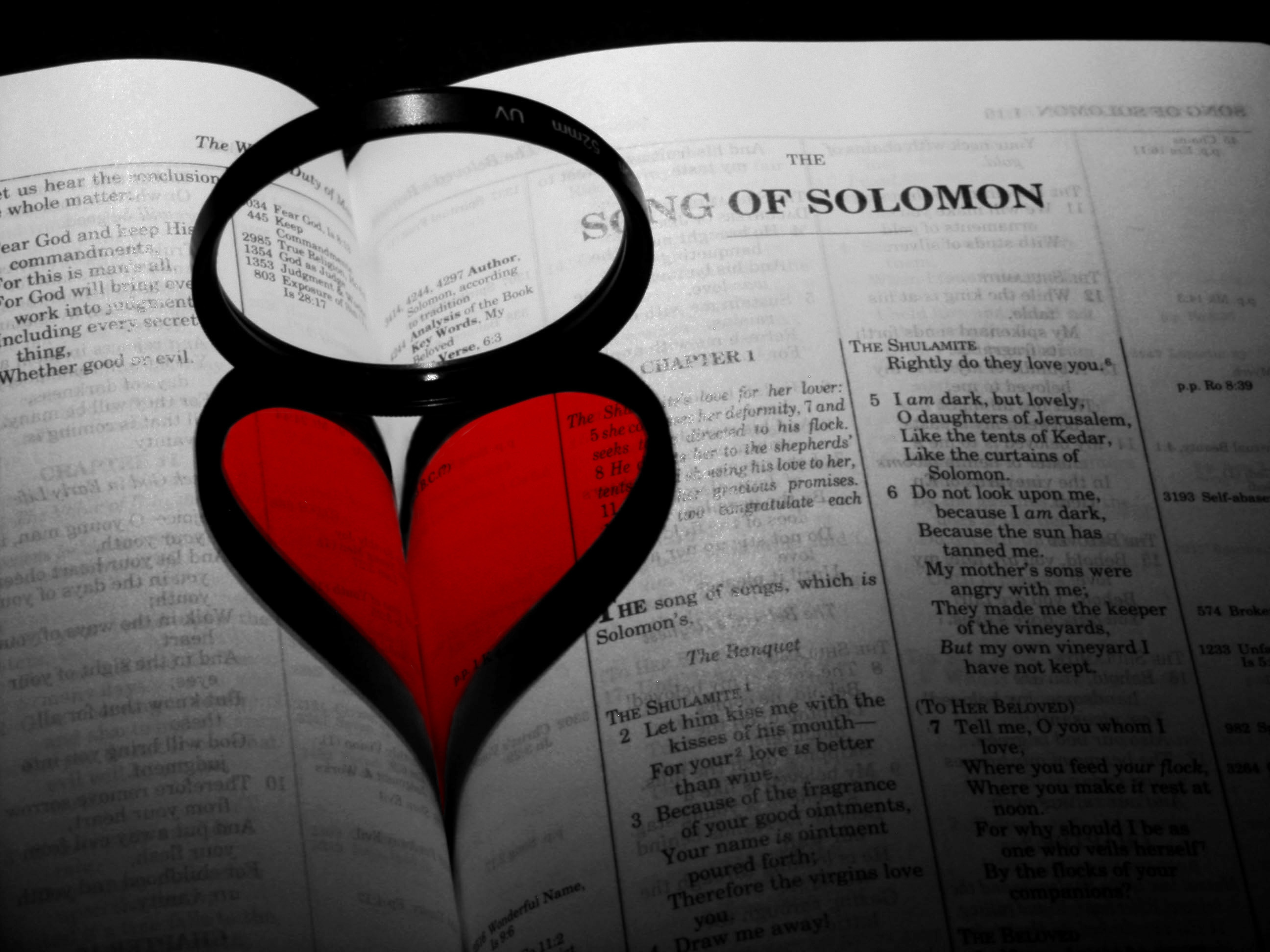
Heart shaped shadow cast by a ring on the pages of the Bible. Song of Solomon chapter 1 is shown on the right page.

This section is the first part of the Prologue, as described by Hess, containing the description of the lovers' first coming together and intimacy (1:2–2:7). The speaker is a woman as definitely established in verse 5 from the adjectival form shehora ("black").

Verses 2–4 contains a 'romantic soliloquy' of a woman about her lover, with two distinctive word-patterns: "your_love (or 'lovemaking') more_than_wine" (verses 2, 4; Hebrew: דדיך מיין, ḏō-ḏe-ḵā mî-ya-yin) and "they love you" (verses 3, 4; Hebrew: אהבוך, ’ă-hê-ḇū-ḵā.).

The first appearance of the first word-pattern is a part of a chiastic structure (verses 2b–3a):

A. good

B. your lovemaking

C. wine
C'. scent

B'. ointments

A'. good

The second chiastic structure of the same word-pattern could be found in verse 4(c–d). The word for the noun "love" (ḏôḏîm) is plural, indicating more that one romantic act, so here "lovemaking" is a better rendering than a simple word "love".

One Hebrew word (ahebuka) becomes the second word-pattern "[they] love you" which is used 'twice as the last word of a tricolon' in verses 3 and 4. The root verb "love" (aheb) is used seven times in the whole book (verses 1:3, 4, 7; 3:1, 2, 3, 4) and always translated in Greek using the same verb 'agapaō' in Septuagint (LXX) (also only seven times in these seven verses of the book).

=== Verse 3 ===
[The Shulamite]

Because of the fragrance of your good ointments,
Your name is ointment poured forth;
Therefore the virgins love you.

- "The virgins" (Hebrew: עלמות, ‘ălāmōṯ): from the root word ‘ălmā ("maiden"), which is only used seven times in the whole Hebrew Bible, twice in this book (the second one in 6:8), (Note: The seven verses containing the word formed from ‘ălmā are Song 1:3 and Song 6:8, Genesis 24:43, Exodus 2:8, Psalm 68:26 (68:25 English), Proverbs 30:19, and Isaiah 7:14.) none denies the possibility of the interpretation of "virgins", some even suggest it, but the most certain meaning is "unmarried women who are, or shortly will be, sexually mature".

=== Verse 4 ===
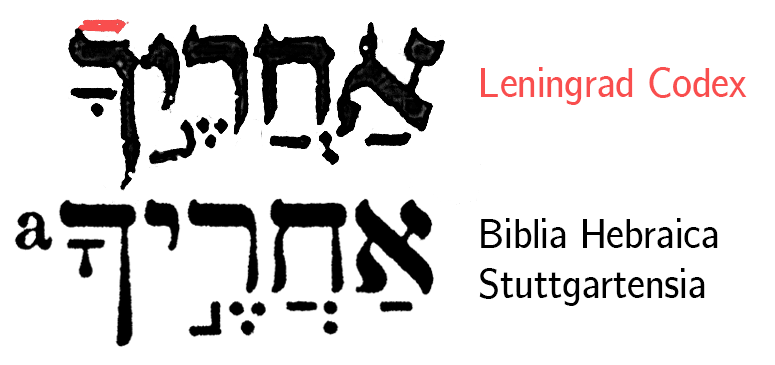
The word "אחריך", meaning "after you", from Song of Solomon 1:4a in the Leningrad Codex (hand-written) and in the Hebrew Bible print edition of the BHS (which omits the Rafe diacritic)

According to the New King James Version (NKJV)

[The Shulamite]

Draw me away!

[The Daughters of Jerusalem]

We will run after ^{[a]}you.

[The Shulamite]

The king has brought me into his chambers.

[The Daughters of Jerusalem]

We will be glad and rejoice in ^{[b]}you.
We will remember your love more than wine.

[The Shulamite]

Rightly do they love you.

- ^{[a]}"You": masculine singular, referring to "the Beloved" ("the man").
- ^{[b]}"You": feminine singular, referring to "the Shulamite" ("the woman").

=== Verse 5 ===
I am black, but comely, O ye daughters of Jerusalem, as the tents of Kedar, as the curtains of Solomon.

The phrase "daughters of Jerusalem" ("friends of the woman" in MEV heading; "girls of Jerusalem" in Living Bible) is introduced as one of the three identifiable speaking voices and principal characters in this chapter, other than the woman, who speaks until verse 7, and the man, whom the woman talks about in 1:2-4 and 7 (he starts to speak in 1:9-11).

=== Verse 6 ===
Do not gaze at me, because I am dark,

because the sun has looked upon me.

My mother's sons were angry with me;

they made me the keeper of the vineyards,
but my own vineyard I have not kept.

- "My mother's sons": suggesting her "full brothers" (not "half-brothers"), who seem to assume responsibility for the woman (cf. Song 8:8), a common practice in patriarchal societies, especially with no mention of her father in the whole book. The woman's mother is mentioned in five places (Song 1:6; 3:4, 6:9; 8:1,2), whereas the man's mother is mentioned once (Song 8:5) and one mention of Solomon's mother (Song 3:11).

=== Verse 7 ===
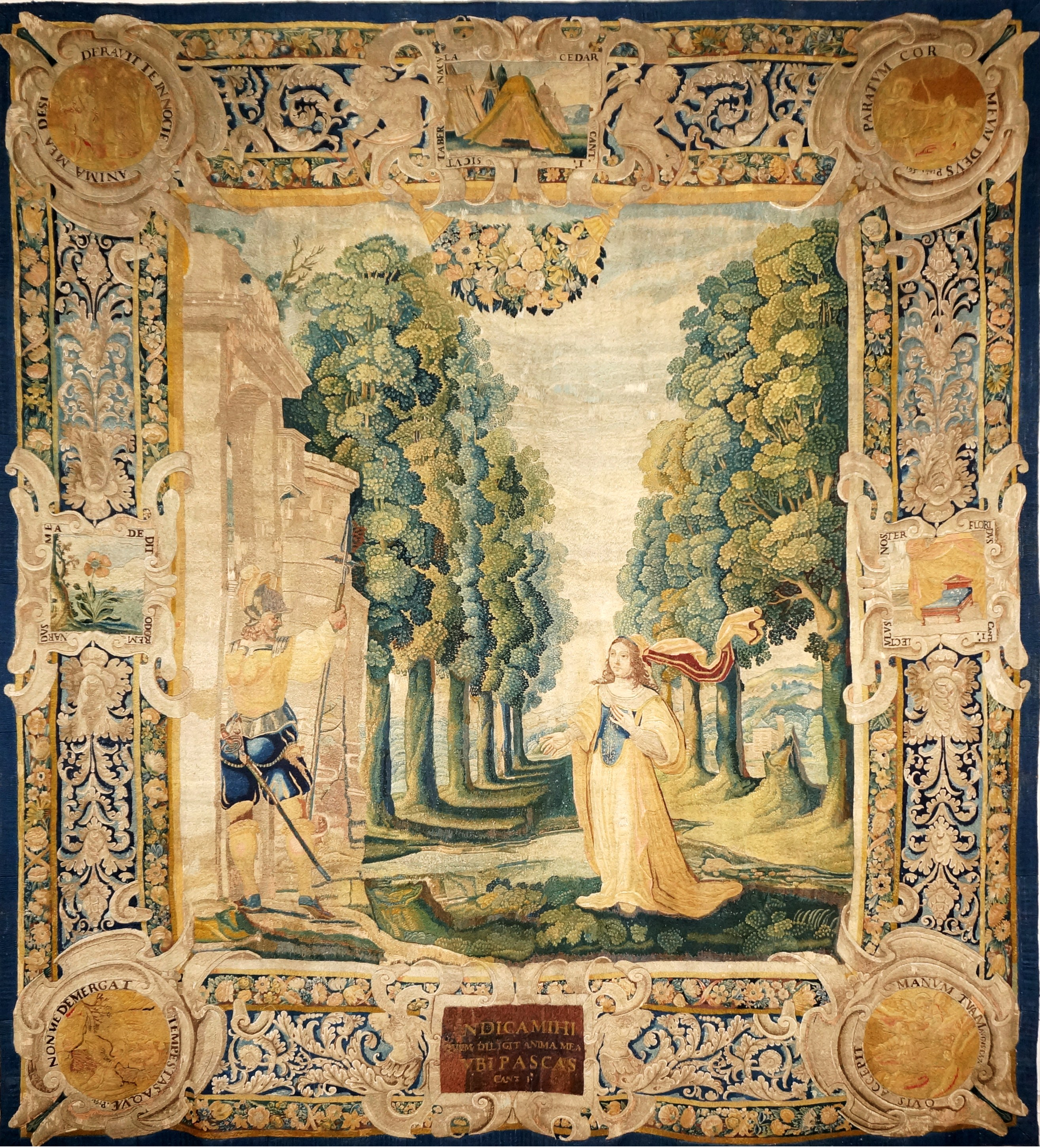
17th-Century French tapestry with the text of Song 1:7 in Latin on the center bottom ("Tell me, O thou whom my soul loveth, where thou feedest"). Palace of Tau, Rheims.

Tell me, you whom my soul loves,

where you pasture your flock,
where you make it lie down at noon;

for why should I be like one who wanders

beside the flocks of your companions?

- "Noon": in warm climates, such as in Palestine, is a time for 'rest and repose', and a convenient occasion for 'an amorous tryst'.

== Male: Response with invitation and praise (1:8–11) ==
Hess notes the distinct structure of the verses containing the male's response in term of the syllable count for the lines in each one:

- Verse 8: 11, 6, and 12
- Verse 9: 7 and 6
- Verse 10: 8 and 6
- Verse 11: 7 and 6

It is clear that verse 8 is structurally out of sequence among these verses and different in the content as well: verse 8 provides the answer to the female's prior question, whereas verses 9–11 focus on her beauty.

=== Verse 8 ===
[He]

If you do not know,

O most beautiful among women,

follow in the tracks of the flock,

and pasture your young goats
beside the shepherds' tents.

All three finite verbs in this verse ("know", "follow" and "pasture") have the woman as the subject, and the second-person feminine singular form is used for "you" or "your". The structure of this verse duplicates the woman's question and plea of verse 7. MEV applies this verse to the "Friends of the woman".

=== Verse 9 ===
[The Man]

I compare you, my love, to a mare among Pharaoh’s chariots.

The man calls his lover, "my love" (or "my [female] friend"; Hebrew: רעיתי, ra‘-yā-ṯî) a specific term of endearment for women that is used 9 times in the book (Song 1:9, 15; 2:2,10, 13; 4:1,7; 5:2; 6:4). The masculine form of the same root word to call the man ("my [male] friend"; Hebrew: רעי, rê-‘î) (Note: Another use of rê·‘î in the Hebrew Bible is in Job 31:9.) is used in a parallel construction with "my beloved" (Hebrew: דודי, ḏōḏî) in Song 5:16.

The comparison to a mare has puzzled modern readers, but Robert Alter explains that Pharaoh’s chariots were drawn by stallions, and commentators since the classical Midrashim have understood the image through the stratagem of loosing a mare in heat among chariot horses, which could throw well-drawn battle lines into chaos. On this reading, the compliment is to the disruptive power of the woman’s attraction, her ability to drive men to distraction.

== Female: Her lover as fragrance (1:12–14) ==
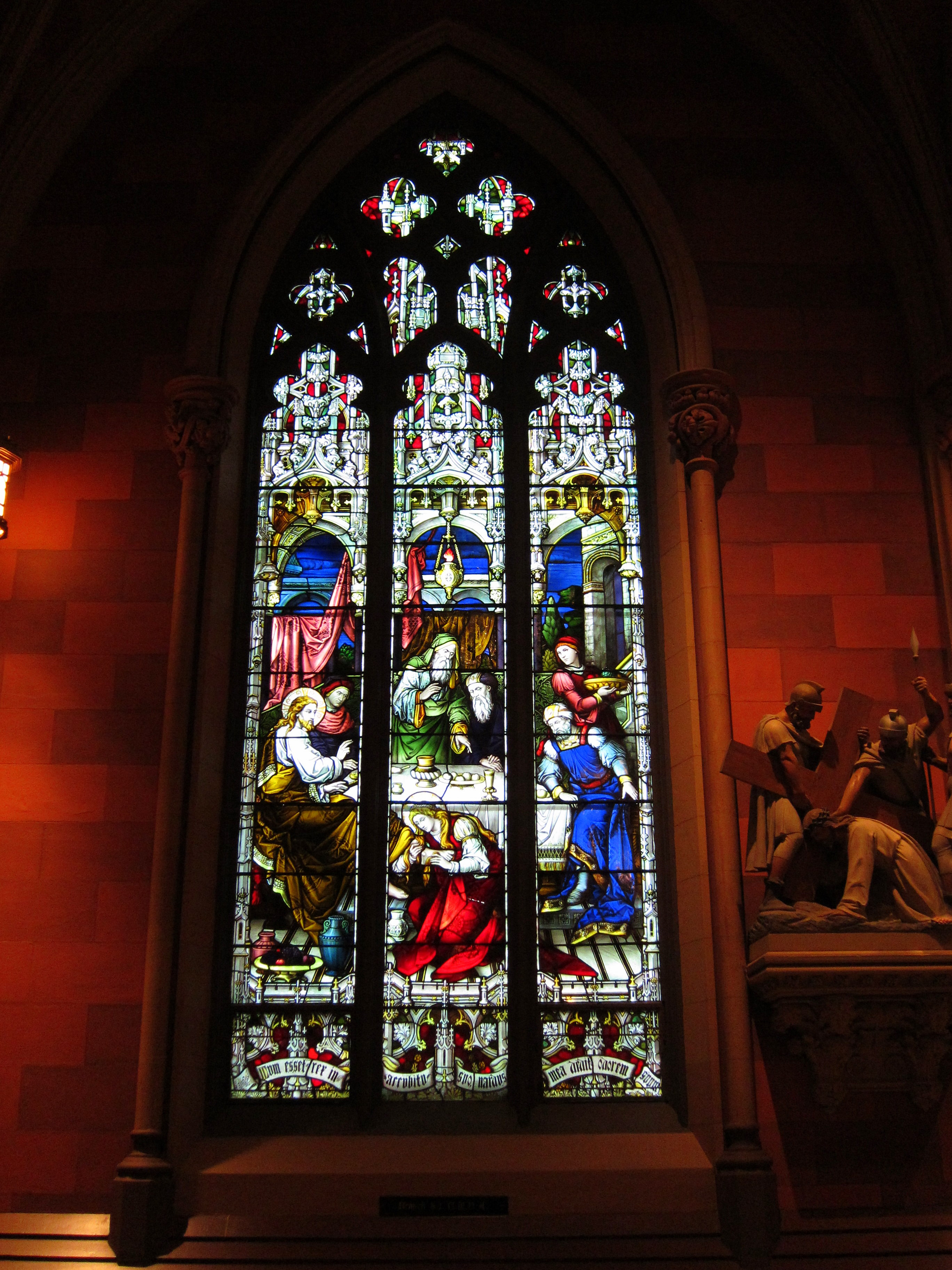
Illustration of "A disciple washes Christ's feet" (Luke 7:38) with the text on the bottom from Song of Solomon 1:12 in Latin (English: "While the king was at his repose, my spikenard sent forth the odour thereof.")

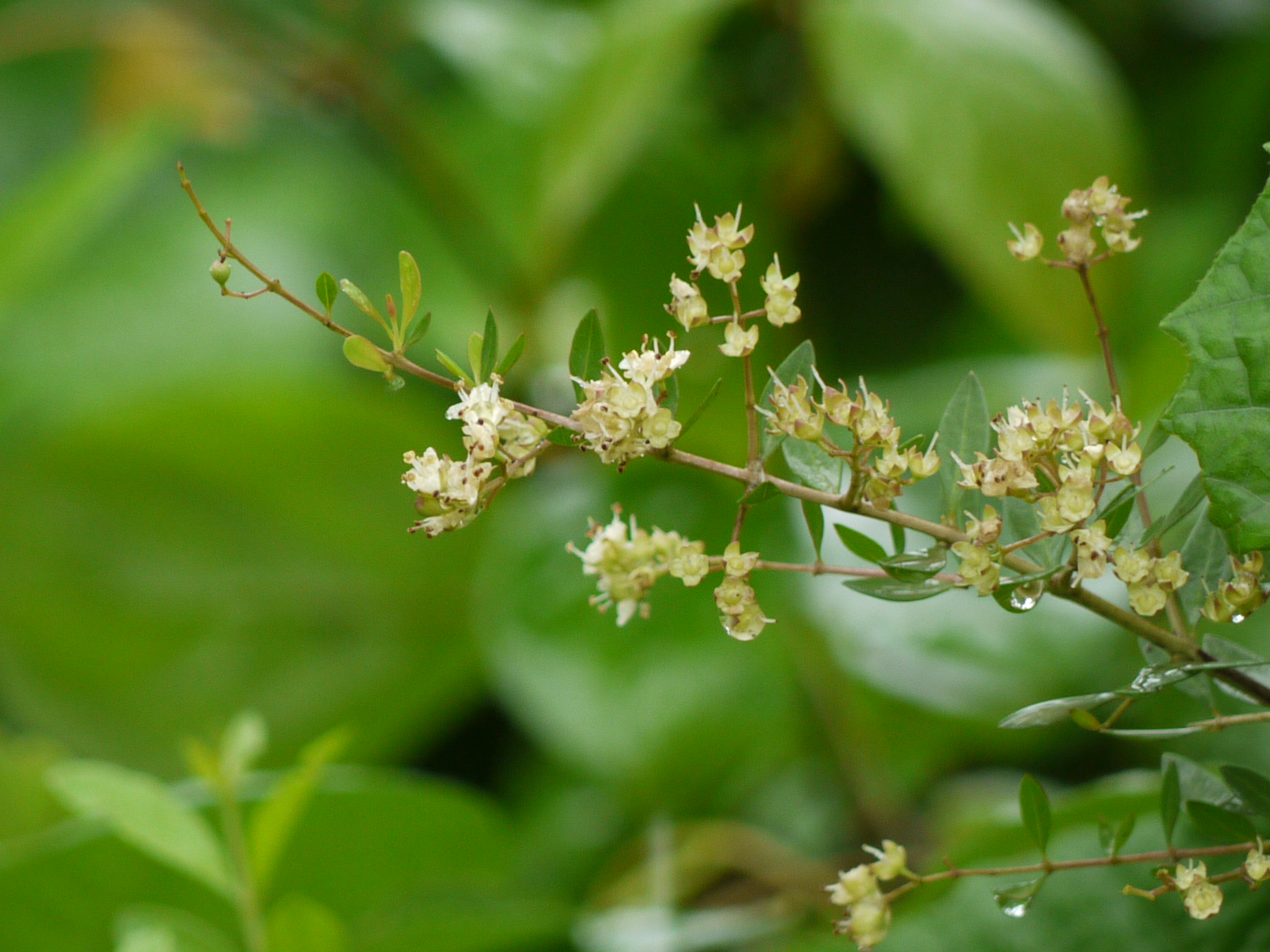
Lawsonia inermis, known as "camphire" or "henna".

In these three verses, the woman describes her lover in the first line and their relationship in the second line. The second word in each of the verses—the king, the myrrh, the henna—are the only words preceded by the definite article הַ (ha) in this section, indicating their identification with one another.

=== Verse 12 ===
While the king is at his table,
My spikenard sends forth its fragrance.

- "His table" (Hebrew: מסבו, me-si-bōw): with a meaning "that which surrounds or is round", likely "a divan or seat set round a room".
- "Spikenard" (or "nard"; Hebrew: nerd): or "perfume"; a substance originated from India, extracted from Nardostachys jatamansi, a plant of the family Valerianaceae, growing in the Himalaya mountains, in Nepal and Bhutan. It was "very precious" as read from the account of Mary's anointing on Jesus, priced more than 300 denarii (Mark 14:5; John 12:2).

=== Verse 14 ===
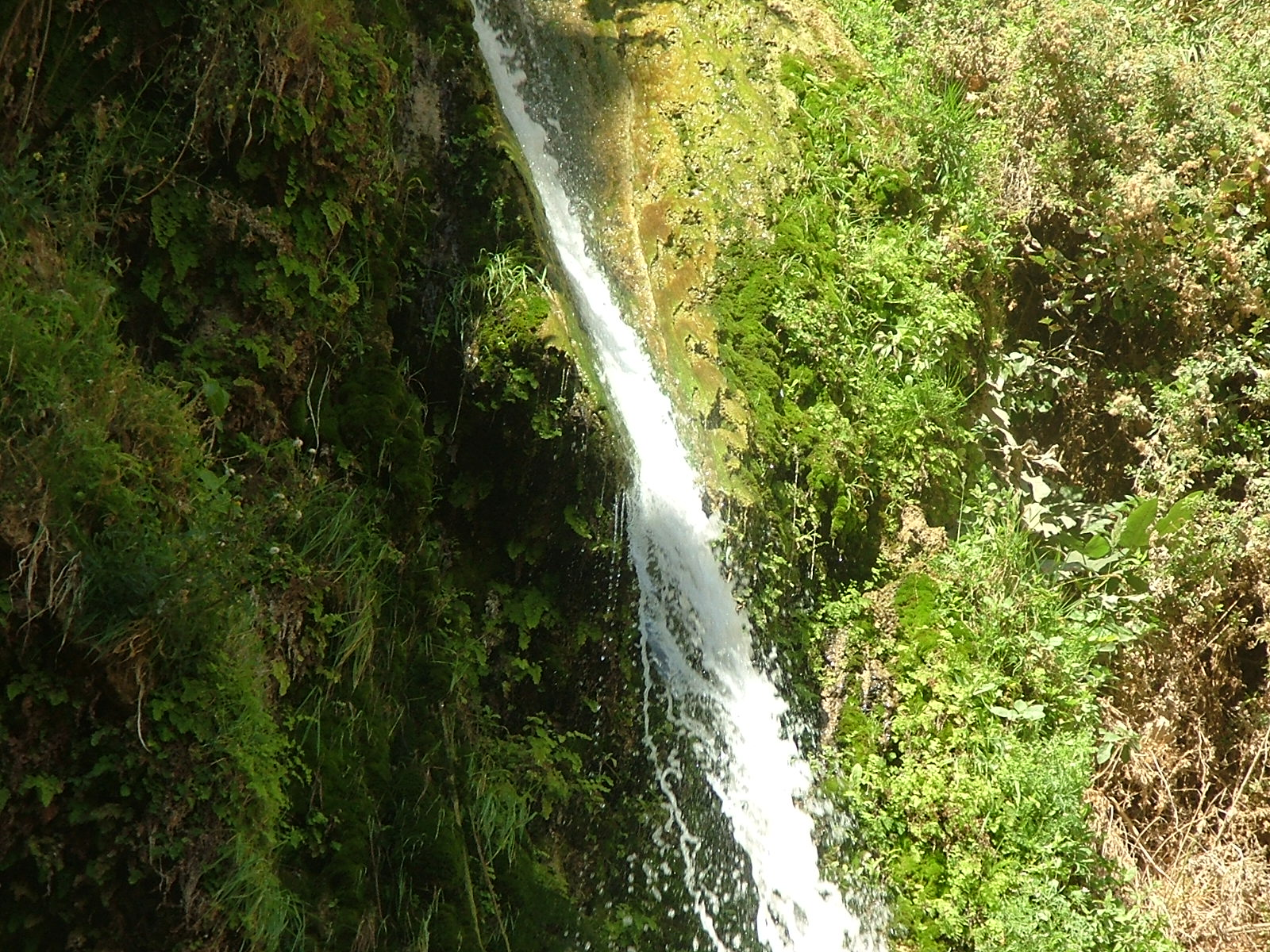
Ein Gedi (=Engedi) nature reserve, Judaean Desert, Israel. (2009)

My beloved is unto me as a cluster of camphire in the vineyards of Engedi.

- "Camphire" (Hebrew: כפר, kō-p̄er) or "Henna" (Lawsonia inermis) from Arabic: حِنَّاء (ALA-LC: ḥinnāʾ). This small shrub (8–10 feet high) produces "clusters of white and yellow blossoms with a powerful fragrance" and continues to grow in En-gedi area from the ancient time until the modern era, providing an enduring illustration of this verse.
- Engedi: lit. "spring of the kid"; an "oasis on the western shore of the Dead Sea".

== Male: Praise of beauty (1:15) ==
=== Verse 15 ===
Behold, you are fair, my love!
Behold, you are fair!
You have dove's eyes.

In this verse and the following, the lovers exchange a mutual admiration in a parallel fashion:

- first the man (verse 15)

a. Ah!

b. you are beautiful

c. my love (ra‘-yā-ṯî)

- then the woman (verse 16):

a'. Ah!

b'. you are beautiful

c'. my love (ḏōḏî)

The response of the man comprises seven words, two of which are repeated (Hebrew: הנך יפה hināḵ yāp̄āh, "behold_you_[are] fair"). The exclamation "you are beautiful" is used most frequently by the man to describe his lover (1:8,15; 2:10, 13; 4:1,7,10; 7:1,6 [Masoretic: 7:2,7]).

== Female: Love in paradise (1:16–2:1) ==
Verses 16–17 focus on the subject of trees, with a closure in verse 2:1 on the subject of flowers, to provide a 'picture of the bed as a spreading growth', using a theme of nature's flora.

== See also ==
- Engedi (Ein Gedi)
- Jerusalem
- Jezreel

== Sources ==
- Bergant, Dianne (2001). Cotter, David W.; Walsh, Jerome T.; Franke, Chris (eds.). The Songs of Songs. Berit Olam (The Everlasting Covenant): Studies In Hebrew Narrative And Poetry. Liturgical Press. ISBN 9780814650691.
- Brenner, Athalya (2007). "21. The Song of Solomon". In Barton, John; Muddiman, John (eds.). The Oxford Bible Commentary (first (paperback) ed.). Oxford University Press. pp. 429–433. ISBN 978-0199277186.
- Coogan, Michael David (2007). Coogan, Michael David; Brettler, Marc Zvi; Newsom, Carol Ann; Perkins, Pheme (eds.). The New Oxford Annotated Bible with the Apocryphal/Deuterocanonical Books: New Revised Standard Version, Issue 48 (Augmented 3rd ed.). Oxford University Press. ISBN 9780195288810.
- Exum, J. Cheryl (2005). Songs of Songs: A Commentary. Old Testament library (reprint ed.). Westminster John Knox Press. ISBN 9780664221904.
- Halley, Henry H. (1965). Halley's Bible Handbook: an abbreviated Bible commentary (24th (revised) ed.). Zondervan Publishing House. ISBN 0-310-25720-4.
- Hess, Richard S. (2005). Songs of Songs. Baker Commentary on the Old Testament Series. Baker Academic. ISBN 9780801027123.
- Longman, Tremper (2001). Songs of Songs. The New International Commentary on the Old Testament. Vol. 26. Wm. B. Eerdmans Publishing. ISBN 9780802825438.
- Tristram, Henry Baker (1868). The Natural History of the Bible: Being a Review of the Physical Geography, Geology, and Meteorology of the Holy Land, with a Description of Every Animal and Plant Mentioned in Holy Scripture (2nd ed.). Society for Promoting Christian Knowledge.
- Würthwein, Ernst (1995). The Text of the Old Testament. Translated by Rhodes, Erroll F. Grand Rapids, MI: Wm. B. Eerdmans. ISBN 0-8028-0788-7.
