= Song of Songs 5 =

Fifth chapter of the Song of Songs

- ← chapter 4 chapter 6 →
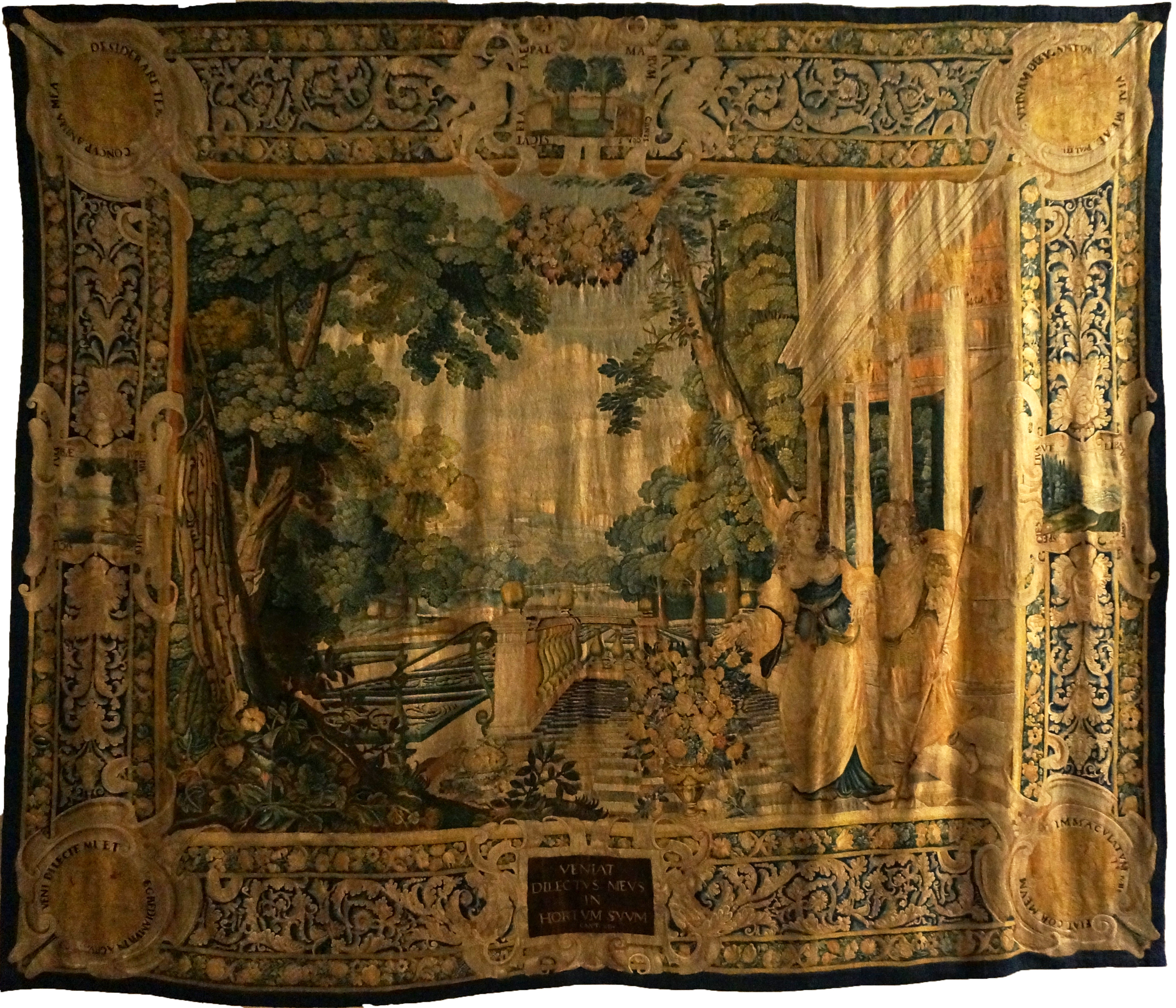
- French tapestry with the text of the Vulgate opening of Song 5:1 in Latin "Veniat dilectus meus in hortum suum" ("Let my beloved come into his garden"). Palais du Tau, Reims, Hauteville, Aisne (17th century).
- Book: Song of Songs
- Category: Ketuvim
- Christian Bible part: Old Testament
- Order in the Christian part: 22

Song of Songs 5 (abbreviated as Song 5) is the fifth chapter of the Song of Songs in the Hebrew Bible or the Old Testament of the Christian Bible. This book is one of the Five Megillot, a collection of short books, together with Ruth, Lamentations, Ecclesiastes and Esther, within the Ketuvim, the third and the last part of the Hebrew Bible. Jewish tradition views Solomon as the author of this book (although this is now largely disputed), and this attribution influences the acceptance of this book as a canonical text.

This chapter opens with the man's response to his lover's consent in the closing verses of chapter 4, but the second part of the chapter relates the refusal of the woman to welcome the man into her room at night, and when she changes her mind, he already disappears; in the next part she looks for him in the city and in the final section (verses 10 onwards) she describes to the daughters of Jerusalem how fair the man is.

== Text ==
The original text is written in Hebrew language. This chapter is divided into 16 verses.

=== Textual witnesses ===
Some early manuscripts containing the text of this chapter in Hebrew are of the Masoretic Text, which includes the Codex Leningradensis (1008). (Note: Since 1947 the current text of Aleppo Codex is missing Song of Songs 3:11, after the word ציון ("Zion"), to the end.) One fragment containing a part of this chapter was found among the Dead Sea Scrolls, assigned as 4Q107 (4QCant^{b}); 30 BCE-30 CE; extant verse 1).

There is also a translation into Koine Greek known as the Septuagint, made in the last few centuries BCE. Extant ancient manuscripts of the Septuagint version include Codex Vaticanus (B; $\mathfrak{G}$^{B}; 4th century), Codex Sinaiticus (S; BHK: $\mathfrak{G}$^{S}; 4th century), and Codex Alexandrinus (A; $\mathfrak{G}$^{A}; 5th century).

== Structure ==
The Modern English Version (MEV) identifies the speakers in this chapter as:

- Song 5:1a = The Man
- Song 5:1b = Friends of the Man
- Song 5:2–8 = The Woman
- Song 5:9 = Friends of the Woman
- Song 5:10–16 = The Woman

The start of the fifth chapter and the close of the fourth chapter are not in the same verse in all versions of the Bible: the Vulgate version of chapter 5 starts with "Veniat dilectus meus ...", which is the end of the woman's speech in the last verse of the fourth chapter in most other versions:

Veniat dilectus meus in hortum suum
et comedat fructus eius optimos.

— Vulgate, CANTICUM CANTICORUM 5:1a
Translation:

Let my beloved come into his garden,
and taste his precious fruits.

— World English Bible, Song of Solomon 4:16b

== Analysis ==
=== Male and chorus: tasting and enjoy the garden (5:1) ===
This verse contains the man's closure of the dialogue at the end of the previous chapter; the call to eat and drink implies consummation. John Gill notes that the words closing the dialogue should not have been separated from the rest of the exchange in chapter 4.

==== Verse 1 ====
[The Beloved/the Man]

I have come to my garden, my sister, my spouse;
I have gathered my myrrh with my spice;
I have eaten my honeycomb with my honey;
I have drunk my wine with my milk.

[To His Friends]

Eat, O friends!
Drink, yes, drink deeply,
O beloved ones!

- "Spouse" or "bride" (Song 4:8-10, 12) together with "sister" (Song 4:9–10, 12) are terms of affection.

=== Female: A second search at night for her dream lover (5:2-8) ===
In this part, the woman refuses to welcome her lover into her room at night (either in reality or a dream; cf. 3:1-5), but when she changes her mind, the man already disappears. She looks for him in the city, then the watchmen (the guards) found her and beat her up. She appeals for help to the daughters of Jerusalem about her lovesick condition.

==== Verse 2 ====
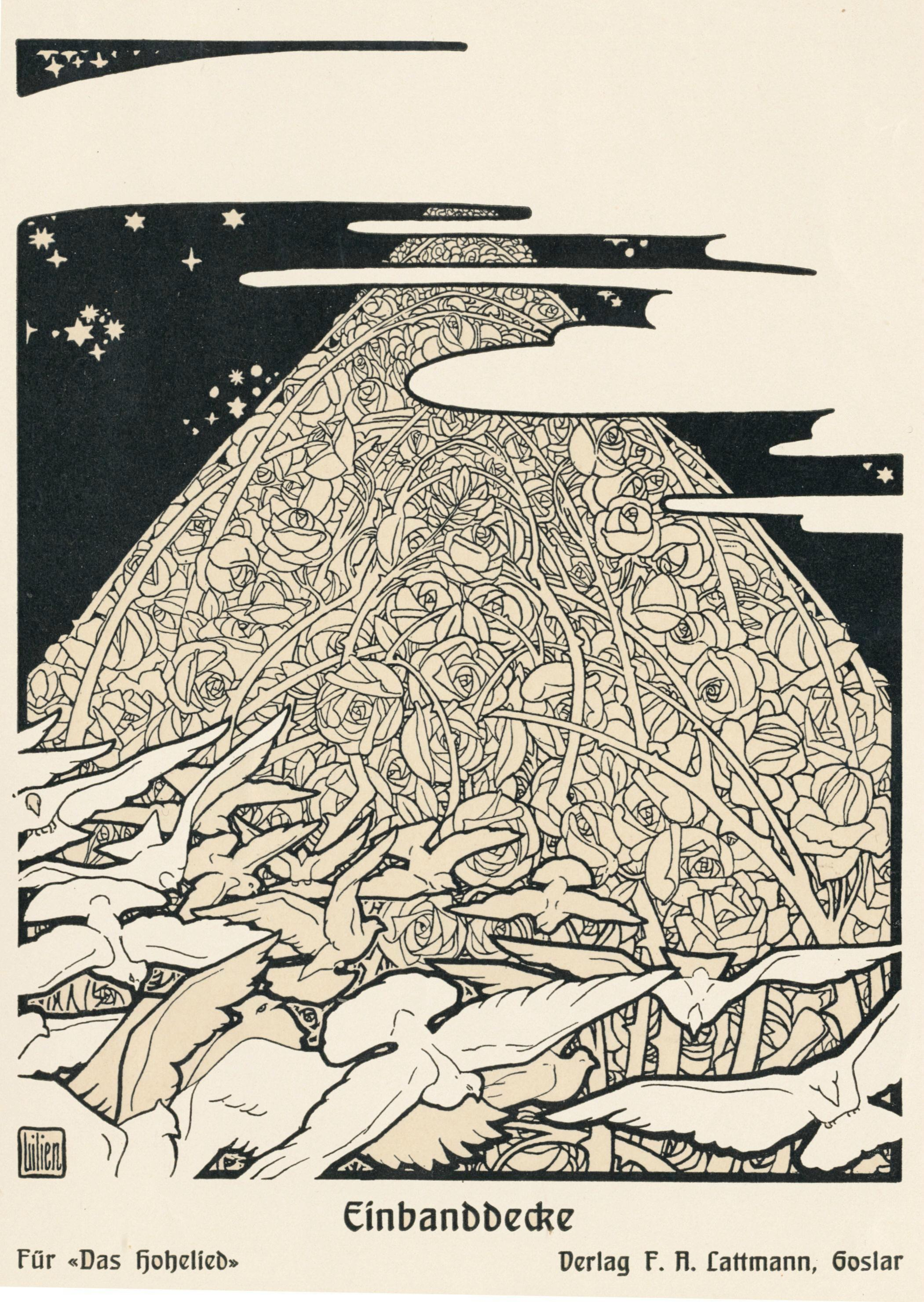
Book cover by Ephraim Moses Lilien for Das Hohelied, depicting the themes of doves and lilies.

I sleep, but my heart waketh: it is the voice of my beloved that knocketh, saying, Open to me, my sister, my love, my dove, my undefiled: for my head is filled with dew, and my locks with the drops of the night.

- "My love" (or "my [female] friend"; Hebrew: רעיתי, ra'-yā-ṯî) a specific term of endearment used by the man for the woman that is used 9 times in the book (Song 1:9, 15; 2:2,10, 13; 4:1,7; 5:2; 6:4). The masculine form of the same root word to call the man ("my [male] friend"; Hebrew: רעי, rê-'î) is used in a parallel construction with "my beloved" (Hebrew: דודי, ḏōḏî) in Song 5:16. The repetition of "my (sister), my (love), my (dove), my (undefiled) is thought to enact the "knocking" of the beloved.
- "Locks": "curls" or "hair"

=== Chorus: Challenge to compare the male lover (5:9) ===
The "daughters of Jerusalem" want to know what the male lover looks like.

=== Female: descriptive poem for the male (5:10-16) ===
The woman describes her lover from head to toe in a waṣf or descriptive poem, using the imagery of fauna and flora for his head, then metals and precious stones for the rest of his body. This waṣf and the other ones (4:1-8; 6:4-10; 7:2-10a (7:1-9a English)) theologically demonstrate the heart of the Song that values the body as not evil but good even worthy of praise, and respects the body with an appreciative focus (rather than lurid). Hess notes that this reflects 'the fundamental value of God's creation as good and the human body as a key part of that creation, whether at the beginning (Genesis 1:26–28) or redeemed in the resurrection (1 Corinthians 15:42, 44)'.

==== Verse 16 ====
His mouth is most sweet: yea, he is altogether lovely. This is my beloved, and this is my friend, O daughters of Jerusalem.

- "Sweet": refers to a drink in Nehemiah 8:10 (cf. Song 7:10).
- "My friend" ("my [male] friend"; Hebrew: רעי, rê-'î): is a specific term of endearment used by the woman for the man that is only used here in the whole book, (Note: Another use of rê·'î in the Hebrew Bible is in Job 31:9 (as "my neighbour").) in a parallel construction with "my beloved" (Hebrew: דודי, ḏōḏî). The feminine form of the same root word to call the woman ("my love" or "my [female] friend"; Hebrew: רעיתי, ra'-yā-ṯî) is used 9 times in the book (Song 1:9, 15; 2:2,10, 13; 4:1,7; 5:2; 6:4).

== Musical settings ==
The phrase Veniat dilectus meus and variant texts such as antiphons based on it have been set to music, for instance in Gregorian chant, and by composers including Alessandro Grandi and Pietro Torri.

== See also ==
- Jerusalem
- Lebanon
- Related Bible parts: Song of Songs 4

== Sources ==
- Bergant, Dianne (2001). Cotter, David W.; Walsh, Jerome T.; Franke, Chris (eds.). The Songs of Songs. Berit Olam (The Everlasting Covenant): Studies In Hebrew Narrative And Poetry. Liturgical Press. ISBN 9780814650691.
- Brenner, Athalya (2007). "21. The Song of Solomon". In Barton, John; Muddiman, John (eds.). The Oxford Bible Commentary (first (paperback) ed.). Oxford University Press. pp. 429–433. ISBN 978-0199277186.
- Coogan, Michael David (2007). Coogan, Michael David; Brettler, Marc Zvi; Newsom, Carol Ann; Perkins, Pheme (eds.). The New Oxford Annotated Bible with the Apocryphal/Deuterocanonical Books: New Revised Standard Version, Issue 48 (Augmented 3rd ed.). Oxford University Press. ISBN 9780195288810.
- Exum, J. Cheryl (2005). Songs of Songs: A Commentary. Old Testament library (reprint ed.). Westminster John Knox Press. ISBN 9780664221904.
- Halley, Henry H. (1965). Halley's Bible Handbook: an abbreviated Bible commentary (24th (revised) ed.). Zondervan Publishing House. ISBN 0-310-25720-4.
- Hess, Richard S. (2005). Songs of Songs. Baker Commentary on the Old Testament Series. Baker Academic. ISBN 9780801027123.
- Longman, Tremper (2001). Songs of Songs. The New International Commentary on the Old Testament. Vol. 26. Wm. B. Eerdmans Publishing. ISBN 9780802825438.
- Würthwein, Ernst (1995). The Text of the Old Testament. Translated by Rhodes, Erroll F. Grand Rapids, MI: Wm. B. Eerdmans. ISBN 0-8028-0788-7.
