= Mount Amana =

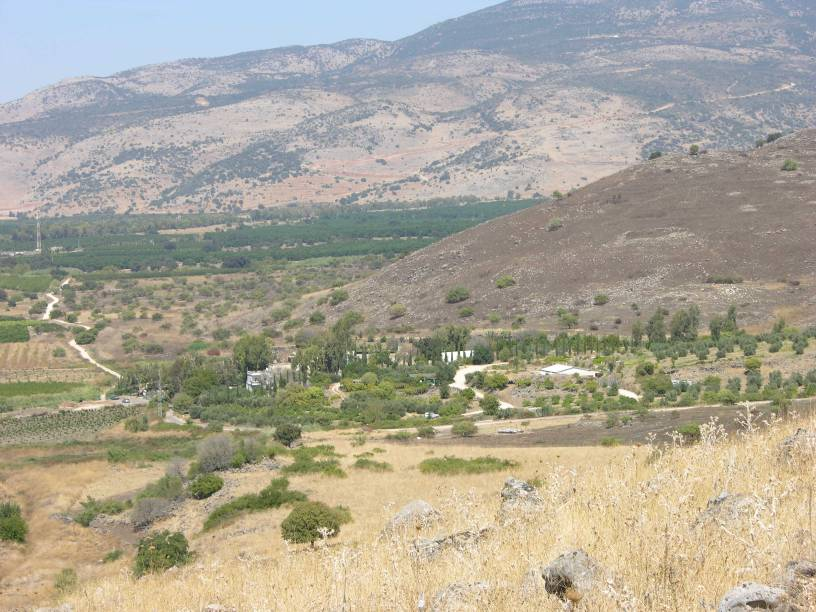
View to Horbat Omrit, to Tel Azzaziat and to the Anti-Lebanon mountains from top of Givat HaEm, Upper Galilee, Israel

Mount Amana (אֲמָנָה, a-mā'na, a-mä'na, uh-may'nuh) is an ancient name for the southern Anti-Lebanon Mountains.

== Geography ==
Mount Amana is at the southern end of the Anti-Lebanon Mountains, near the source of the river Abana. Paul Haupt identifies this mountain as Jabal az-Zabadany, northwest of Damascus.

Mount Amana is often confused with Mount Amanus, also known as Mount Hor, at the north end of the Syrian plain. (Note: eg. Orr 1915, p. 113; Robinson 1835, p. 51; Schwarz 1850, p. 19)

== Notable mentions ==
Mount Amana is mentioned in Song of Songs (4:8) along with Lebanon, Senir, and Mount Hermon. Senir, Mount Hermon, and Amana are all prominent mountains on the northern end of Israel in the Anti-Lebanon Mountains. In this era, Lebanon referred to both the Lebanese Mountains and the Anti-Lebanese mountains without referring to any particular peak. A targum on this verse reads "They that dwell on the river Amana shall offer thee a gift."

The "mountains of Sanir and Amana" are also mentioned in the Book of Jubilees as lying within the inheritance of Shem (8:21), or more specifically, Arpachshad (9:4).

Winckler was the first scholar to suggest that the Mount Ammananu referred to in the inscriptions of Tiglath-pileser III should be understood as identical with Amanah, a claim which has been confirmed by more recent scholarship.

Tacitus records that a triumphal arch was erected on Mount Amana (possibly Mount Amanus) in honor of Germanicus after his death.

== Amana River ==
In the Masoretic Text of the Hebrew Bible, the name "Amana" is given in the margin to 2 Kings 5:12 as an alternate reading of Abana, and contemporary scholars prefer the reading Amana, following the targum. This river flows through Damascus and is currently known as the Barada.

== Meanings ==
The name Amana means "constant", "firm", "faith", "truth", "credulity", or "a nurse". It was translated in the Septuagint as πιστεως, meaning "trust", "fidelity", or "faithfulness"

== Sources ==
- Bloch, A.; Bloch, C. (1995). The Song of Songs: A New Translation with an Introduction and Commentary. University of California Press. ISBN 978-0-520-22675-3.
- Cogan, M. (1984). "'... From the Peak of Amanah'". Israel Exploration Journal. 34 (4): 255–259. JSTOR 27925953.
- Douglas, J.D.; Tenney, M.C.; Silva, M. (2011). "Amana". Zondervan Illustrated Bible Dictionary. Zondervan. ISBN 978-0-310-49235-1.
- Easton, Matthew George (1897). "Amana" . Easton's Bible Dictionary (New and revised ed.). T. Nelson and Sons.
- Haparchi, I. (1852) [1322]. Edelmann, Ẓ.H. (ed.). ספר כפתור ופרח (in Hebrew). Berlin: Yulius Zittenfeld. p. 21.
- Freedman, D.N.; Myers, A.C. (2000). "Amana". Eerdmans Dictionary of the Bible. Amsterdam University Press. p. 49. ISBN 978-90-5356-503-2.
- Gill, J. (1748–63). Exposition of the Old Testament. 4 Kings 5.12.
- Haupt, P. (1902). Biblical Love-ditties: A Critical Interpretation and Translation, of the Song of Solomon. Chicago, IL: Open Court. p. 8.
- Ikeda, Y. (1978). "Hermon, Sirion and Senir". Annual of the Japanese Biblical Institute. 4: 32–44.
- Kraeling, E.G.H. (2008). Aram and Israel: The Aramaeans in Syria and Mesopotamia. Wipf & Stock Publishers. ISBN 978-1-60608-394-9.
- Orr, J. (1915). "Amana". The International Standard Bible Encyclopaedia. Vol. 1. Howard-Severance Company. p. 113.
- Porter, J.L. (1855). Five Years in Damascus. Vol. I. London: John Murray. pp. 255–278.
- Rand, W.W. (2015). "Amana". The Bible Dictionary. Harrington, Delaware: Delmarva.
- Robinson, E. (1835) [1728]. "Amana". In Calmet, A.A. (ed.). Calmet's Dictionary of the Holy Bible. Crocker and Brewster. p. 51.
- Schwarz, Joseph (1850). A Descriptive Geography and Brief Historical Sketch of Palestine. Translated by Leeser, Isaac. New York: A. Hart.
- Tacitus (1876) [116]. Annals . Book 2, Chapter 83..
- Walton, J.H.; Matthews, V.H.; Chavalas, M.W. (2012). The IVP Bible Background Commentary: Old Testament. InterVarsity Press. ISBN 978-0-8308-6608-3.
- Wells, E.; Calmet, A.A. (1817). Sacred Geography; or, A Companion to the Holy Bible. Calmet's Dictionary of the Holy Bible (Revised ed.). Charlestown: Samuel Etheridge, Jr.
- Winckler, H. (1892). Alttestamentliche Untersuchungen. Leipzig: E. Pfeiffer.
