= Song of Songs 2 =

Second chapter of Song of Songs describing the intense love between a man and a woman

- ← chapter 1 chapter 3 →
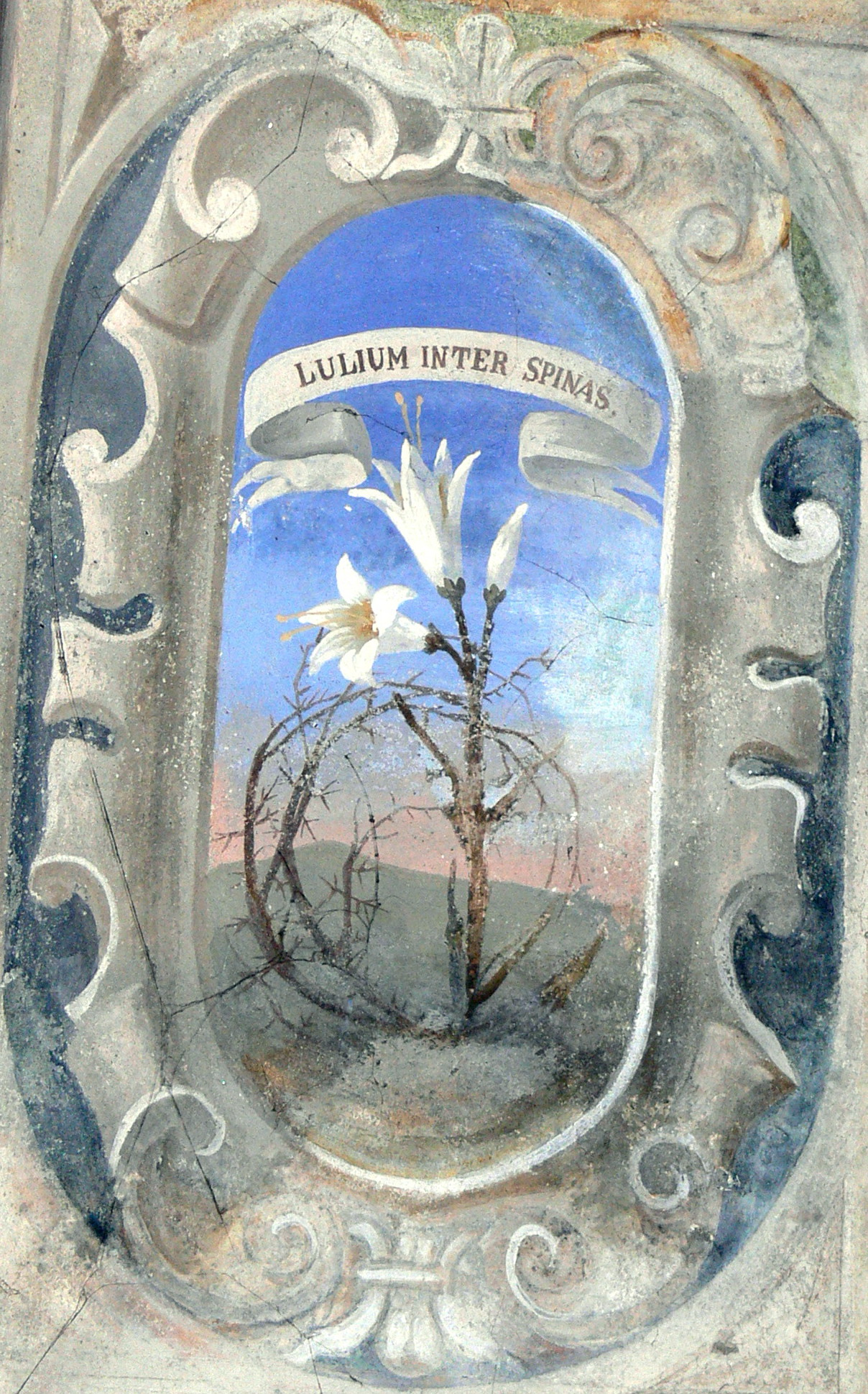
- Church fresco showing a lily among thorns according to a quotation from the Song of Solomon, Santa Caterina del Sasso (Varese).
- Book: Song of Songs
- Category: Ketuvim
- Christian Bible part: Old Testament
- Order in the Christian part: 22

Song of Songs 2 (sometimes abbreviated to Song 2) is the second chapter of the Song of Songs in the Hebrew Bible or the Old Testament of the Christian Bible. This book is one of the Five Megillot, a collection of short books, together with Ruth, Lamentations, Ecclesiastes and Esther, within the Ketuvim, the third and the last part of the Hebrew Bible. Jewish tradition views Solomon as the author of this book (although this is now largely disputed), and this attribution influences the acceptance of this book as a canonical text. This chapter contains a dialogue in the open air and several female poems with the main imagery of flora and fauna.

== Text ==
The original text is written in Hebrew language. This chapter is divided into 17 verses.

=== Textual witnesses ===
Some early manuscripts containing the text of this chapter in Hebrew are of the Masoretic Text, which includes the Aleppo Codex (10th century), and Codex Leningradensis (1008). Some fragments containing parts of this chapter were found among the Dead Sea Scrolls, assigned as 4Q107 (4QCant^{b}); 30 BCE-30 CE; extant verses 9–17).

There is also a translation into Koine Greek known as the Septuagint, made in the last few centuries BCE. Extant ancient manuscripts of the Septuagint version include Codex Vaticanus (B; $\mathfrak{G}$^{B}; 4th century), Codex Sinaiticus (S; BHK: $\mathfrak{G}$^{S}; 4th century), and Codex Alexandrinus (A; $\mathfrak{G}$^{A}; 5th century).

== Structure ==
The Modern English Version (MEV) attributes the voices in this chapter as follows:

- Song 2:1 = The Woman (continued from Song 1:16–17)
- Song 2:2 = The Man
- Song 2:3–17 = The Woman

== Female: Love in paradise (1:16–2:1) ==
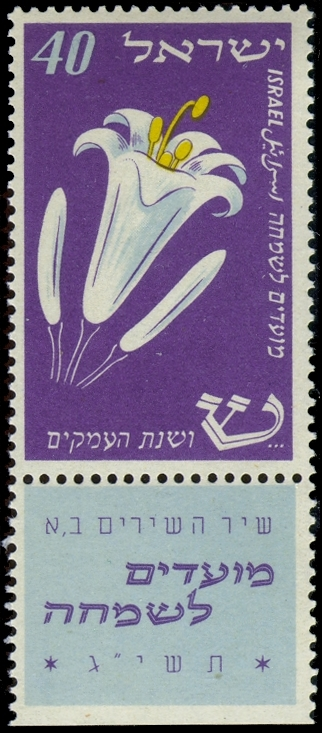
Inscription "The lily of the valleys" from "Song of Solomon 2:1" on "Joyous Festivals 5713" stamp of Israel - 40 mil

Verse 1 closes a poetic section providing a 'picture of the bed as a spreading growth', using a theme of nature's floras, starting from the previous chapter with verses 1:16–17 focusing on the subject of trees and verse 2:1 on the subject of flowers.

=== Verse 1 ===
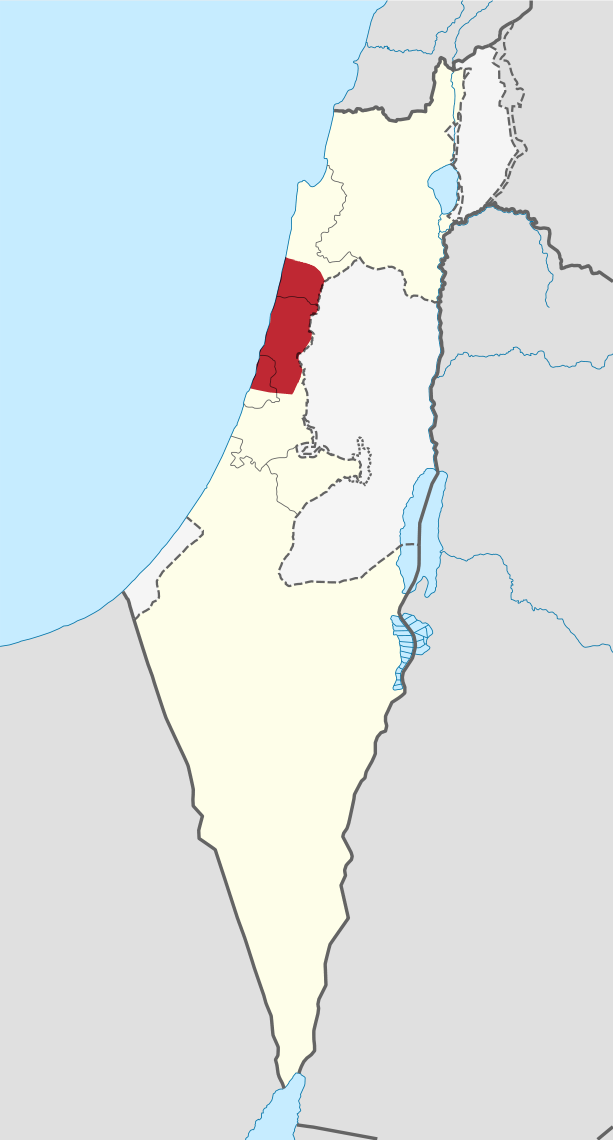
Sharon plain in Israeli Coastal Plain region

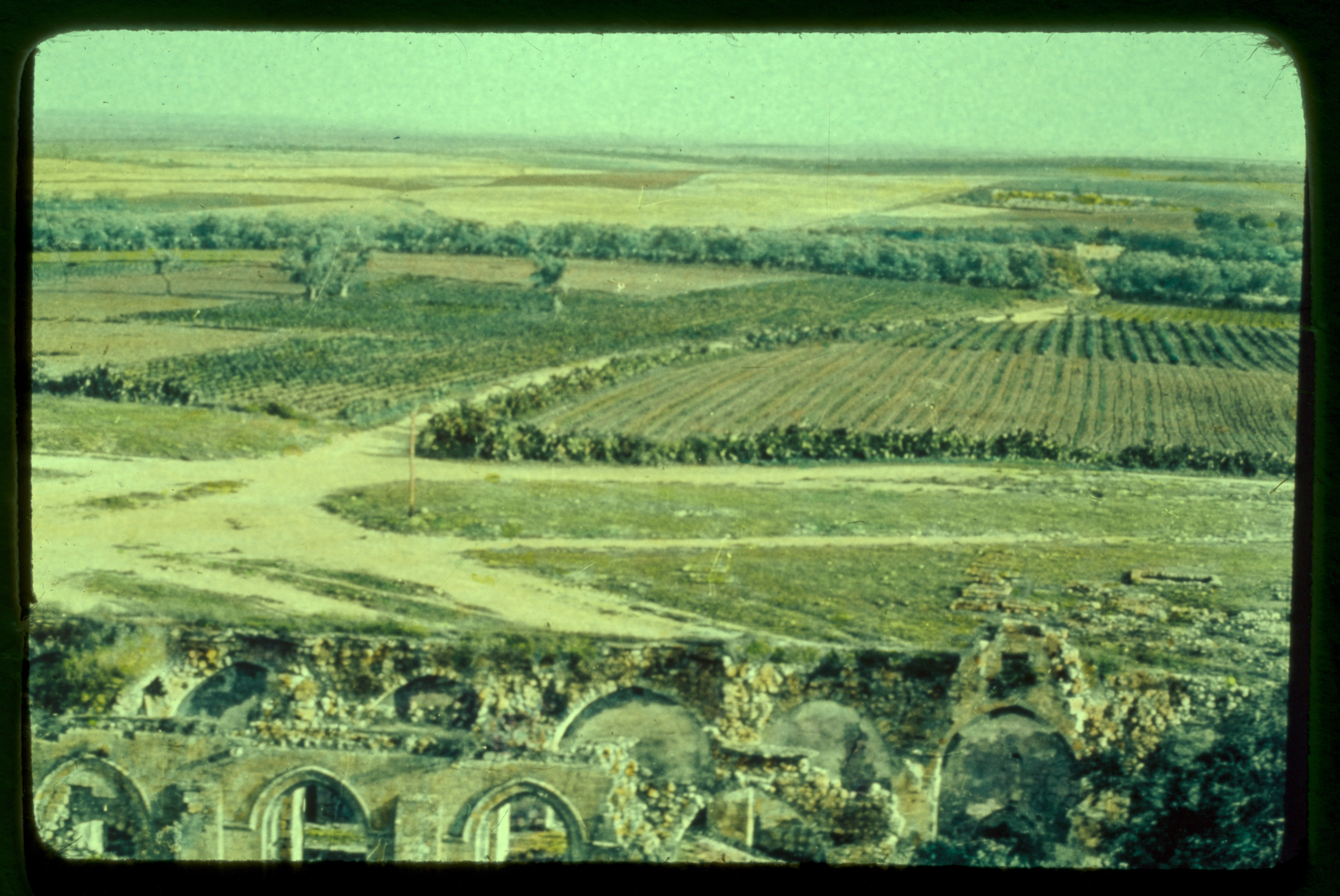
Plain of Sharon from the Tower of Ramleh. Jaffa to Jerusalem (between 1950 and 1977)

I am the rose of Sharon, and the lily of the valleys.

- "Rose of Sharon" (Hebrew: חבצלת השרון, ḥăḇatzeleṯ hasharon; Septuagint: "ἄνθος τοῦ πεδίου"; Vulgate: "flos campi"; Wiclif: "a flower of the field"): is thought to be a kind of crocus growing as a "lily among brambles" (Song 2:1-2) in the Sharon plain.
- "Rose": is translated from the Hebrew word ḥăḇatzeleṯ, that occurs two times in the scriptures, beside in this verse also in Isaiah 35:1, which reads, "the desert shall bloom like the rose". The word translated as "rose" in KJV is rendered variously as "lily" (Septuagint: "κρίνον", Vulgate: "lilium", Wiclif: "lily"), "jonquil" (Jerusalem Bible) and "crocus" (RSV).
- "Sharon": the Mediterranean coastal plain which spans south of the slopes of Mount Carmel, extending about 30 miles south to the Yarkon River north of Joppa, varying from about 8 to 12 miles in width. It is mentioned 5 times in the Old Testament; the other four references are in Isaiah 33:9; 35:2; 65:10; 1 Chronicles 27:29.

== Male: My love is like a flower (2:2) ==
Verse 2 links to verse 1 on the use of "lily" (or "lotus"), and forms a parallel with verse 3 on the word order and the use of particles ("as" or "like", "so") as well as the 'terms of endearment' ("my love", "my beloved", or "my darling", "my lover").

=== Verse 2 ===
As the lily among thorns, so is my love among the daughters.

- "Thorns" (Hebrew plural: ḥoḥim; singular: ח֖וֹחַ, ḥoaḥ): the Hebrew root word is found twelve times in the Bible: aside from this verse, also in 1 Samuel 13:6; 2 Kings 14:9 (twice); 2 Chronicles 25:18 (twice); 2 Chronicles 33:11; Job 31:40; Job 40:26 [41:12 English]; Proverbs 26:9; Isaiah 34:13; Hosea 9:6).
- "My love" (or "my [female] friend"; Hebrew: רעיתי, raʻyāṯî) a specific term of endearment used by the man for the woman that is used nine times in the book (Song 1:9, 15; 2:2,10, 13; 4:1,7; 5:2; 6:4). The masculine form of the same root word to call the man ("my [male] friend"; Hebrew: רעי, rēʻi) is used in a parallel construction with "my beloved" (Hebrew: דודי, doḏi) in Song of Songs 5:16.

== Female: A pastoral scene (2:3-7) ==
The verse 3 shows an 'excellent synonymous parallelism' with verse 2 on the word order and the use of certain words, such as "as" or "like", "so", "among" or "between", "my love"/"my beloved" or "my darling"/"my lover". Each verse begins with a preposition of comparison ("as"), followed by three Hebrew words consisting of a singular noun, a preposition ("among" or "between"; be^n) and a plural common noun with a definite article.

=== Verse 3 ===
As the apple tree among the trees of the wood, so is my beloved among the sons.
I sat down under his shadow with great delight, and his fruit was sweet to my taste.

The sensual imagery of "apple tree" as a place of romance is still used in modern times in songs such as "In the Shade of the Old Apple Tree" and "Don't Sit Under the Apple Tree".

=== Verse 4 ===
He brought me to the banqueting house, and his banner over me was love.

- "The banqueting house" is a rendering of the phrase bet hayyayin, which is only used here in the Bible, literally meaning "house of the wine". Some near synonyms include "house of the drinking of wine" (bet misteh hayyayin) in Esther 7:8, and "house for drinking" (bet misteh) in Jeremiah 16:8 and Ecclesiastes 7:2.

=== Verse 5 ===
Sustain me with raisins,
refresh me with apples;
for I am faint with love.

The first two lines of this verse form a 'distinctive structure', using verbs and preposition of the same ideas: "refresh (sustain) me"/"revive (refresh) me", "with raisins"/"with apples". The word "apple(s)" links to the first word of verse 3, while the word "love" links to the last word of verse 4.

=== Verse 7 ===
I charge you, O daughters of Jerusalem,
By the gazelles or by the does of the field,
Do not stir up nor awaken love
Until it pleases.

- Cross references: Song of Songs 3:5; 8:4
- "Charge" or "adjure"

The names of God are apparently substituted with similar sounding phrases depicting 'female gazelles' (צְבָא֔וֹת, tseḇā’ōṯ) for [God of] hosts (צבאות tseḇā’ōṯ), and 'does of the field'/'wild does/female deer' (אילות השדה, ’ay-lōṯ ha-śā-ḏeh) for God Almighty (אל שדי, ’êl shaddai).

== Female: Her lover pursues her (2:8–9) ==
This section starts a poetic exposition of lovers who are joined and separated (Song 2:8–3:5).

Verses 8–17 form a unity of a poem of the spring by the woman, beginning with 'the voice of my beloved' (qōl dōḏî; or 'the sound of his [approach]'), which signals his presence before he even speaks.

Andrew Harper suggests that the scene moves now from Jerusalem ("daughters of Jerusalem" in verse 7) to "some royal residence in the country", probably in the northern hills. Verse 8b refers to her beloved "leaping upon the mountains, bounding over the hills". St. Ambrose comments by way of a paraphrase,

Let us see him leaping; he leaped out of heaven into the virgin, out of the womb into the manger, out of the manger into Jordan, out of Jordan to the cross, from the cross into the tomb, out of the grave into heaven.

== Male: Invitation to come away (2:10-14) ==
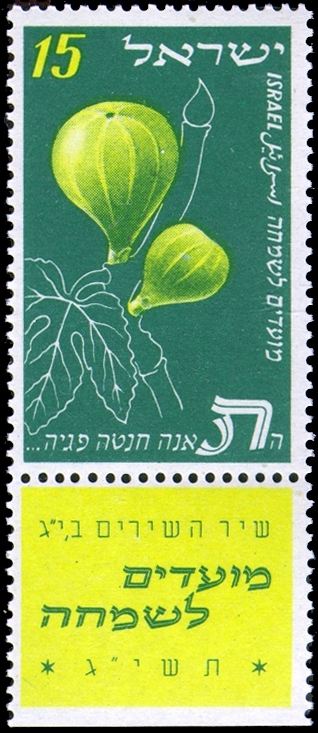
Inscription "The fig tree puteth forth her green figs" from "Song of Solomon 2:13", "Joyous Festivals 5713" stamp of Israel - 15 mil.

=== Verse 13 ===
The fig tree putteth forth her green figs, and the vines with the tender grape give a good smell. Arise, my love, my fair one, and come away.

- "Green figs": is translated from the Hebrew word paggâh, which occurs in its Aramaic form in the city name, "Bethphage". The plural form paggîm are used to call unripe fruits of the early fig (Hebrew: bikkûrâh), which takes about four months to ripe, usually towards the end of June, in contrast to the late figs (Hebrew: tě’çnîm) that grow continuously on the new branches and ripen usually they ripen from August onwards in Palestine.
- "My love": see notes on verse 2.

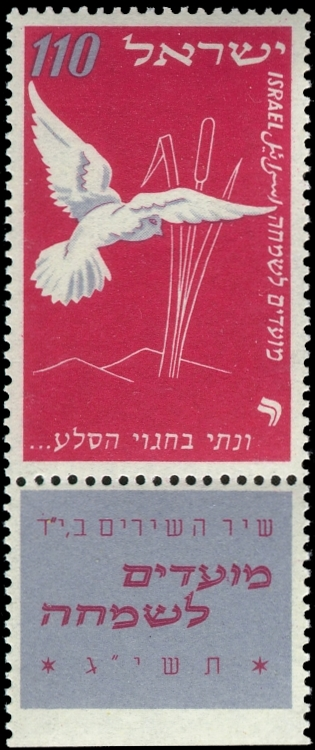
Inscription "O my dove that art in the clefts of the rock" from "Song of Solomon 2:14", "Joyous Festivals 5713" stamp of Israel - 110 mil.

=== Verse 14 ===
O my dove, that art in the clefts of the rock, in the secret places of the stairs, let me see thy countenance, let me hear thy voice; for sweet is thy voice, and thy countenance is comely.

- "Dove" (as in Song 5:2, 6:9) serves as a 'metaphor for inaccessibility'.

== Couple: Protect our love (2:15) ==
=== Verse 15 ===
Catch the foxes for us,

the little foxes

that spoil the vineyards,

for our vineyards are in blossom.

- "Foxes": or "jackals". The foxes are associated with the obstacle of the blossoming romantic relationship.

== Female: Love affirmed, gratification delayed (2:16-17) ==
Unlike the ambiguity of the speaker (or speakers) in the previous verse, the two verses in this section are no doubt spoken by the woman, affirming the mutual affection with her lover.

=== Verse 16 ===
My beloved is mine, and I am his: he feedeth among the lilies.

In reversed order compared to Song 6:3.

== See also ==
- Catch for Us the Foxes
- Jerusalem
- Sharon plain
- Related Bible parts: Song of Songs 1

== Sources ==
- Bergant, Dianne (2001). Cotter, David W.; Walsh, Jerome T.; Franke, Chris (eds.). The Songs of Songs. Berit Olam (The Everlasting Covenant): Studies In Hebrew Narrative And Poetry. Liturgical Press. ISBN 9780814650691.
- Brenner, Athalya (2007). "21. The Song of Solomon". In Barton, John; Muddiman, John (eds.). The Oxford Bible Commentary (first (paperback) ed.). Oxford University Press. pp. 429–433. ISBN 978-0199277186.
- Coogan, Michael David (2007). Coogan, Michael David; Brettler, Marc Zvi; Newsom, Carol Ann; Perkins, Pheme (eds.). The New Oxford Annotated Bible with the Apocryphal/Deuterocanonical Books: New Revised Standard Version, Issue 48 (Augmented 3rd ed.). Oxford University Press. ISBN 9780195288810.
- Exum, J. Cheryl (2005). Songs of Songs: A Commentary. Old Testament library (reprint ed.). Westminster John Knox Press. ISBN 9780664221904.
- Halley, Henry H. (1965). Halley's Bible Handbook: an abbreviated Bible commentary (24th (revised) ed.). Zondervan Publishing House. ISBN 0-310-25720-4.
- Hess, Richard S. (2005). Songs of Songs. Baker Commentary on the Old Testament Series. Baker Academic. ISBN 9780801027123.
- Longman, Tremper (2001). Songs of Songs. The New International Commentary on the Old Testament. Vol. 26. Wm. B. Eerdmans Publishing. ISBN 9780802825438.
- Würthwein, Ernst (1995). The Text of the Old Testament. Translated by Rhodes, Erroll F. Grand Rapids, MI: Wm. B. Eerdmans. ISBN 0-8028-0788-7.
