= Hauteville, Aisne =

Hauteville
- Commune
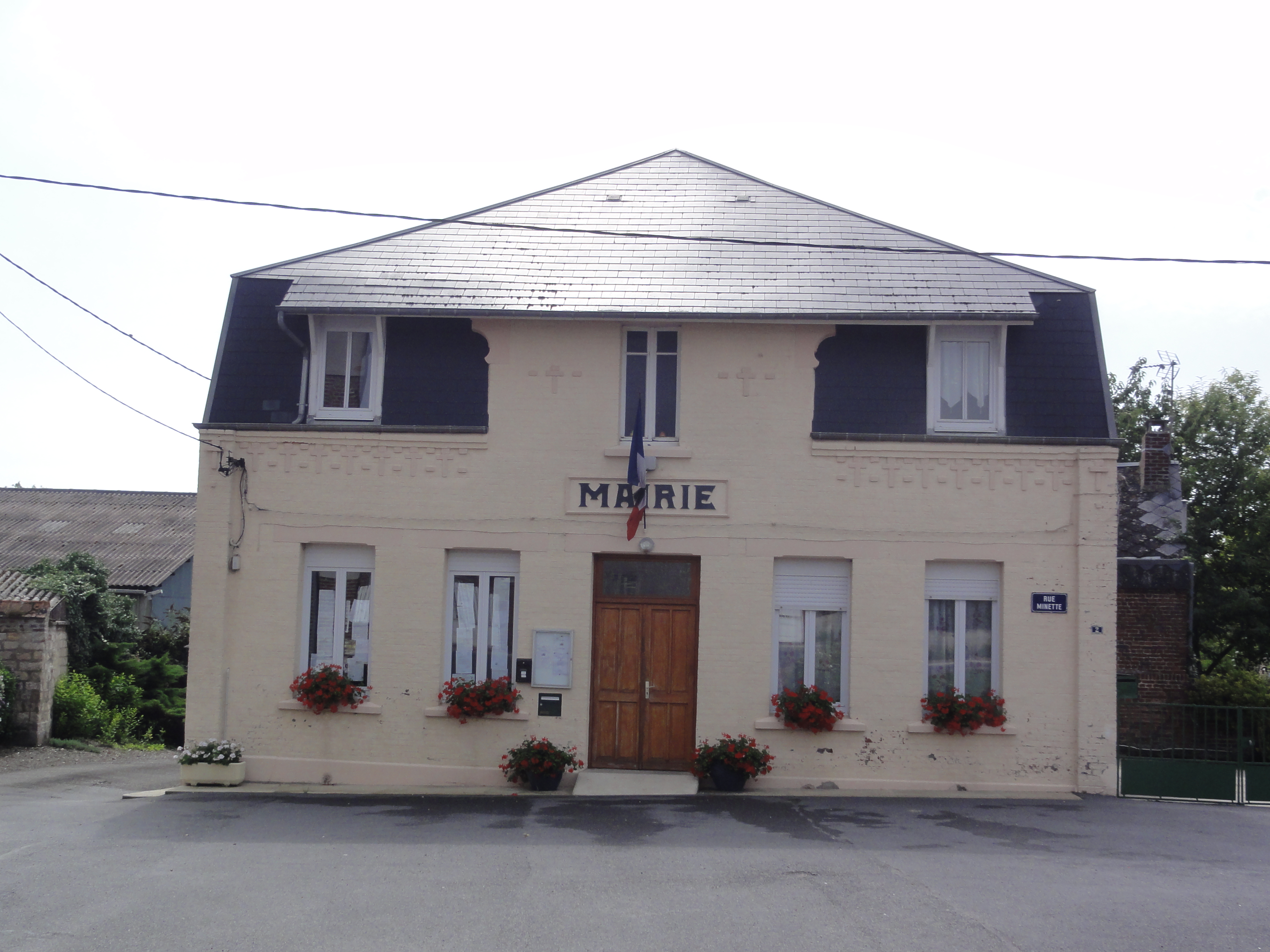
- The town hall of Hauteville

- Coat of arms
- Location of Hauteville
- Location within France Location within Hauts-de-France
- Coordinates: 49°52′42″N 3°31′23″E
- Country: France
- Region: Hauts-de-France
- Department: Aisne
- Arrondissement: Vervins
- Canton: Guise

Government
  - Mayor (2026–32): Willy Huyghe
- Area^{1}: 7.1 km^{2} (2.7 sq mi)
- Elevation: 94 m (308 ft)
- Highest elevation: 151 m (495 ft)
- Lowest elevation: 75 m (246 ft)
- Population (2023): 189
  - Density: 27/km^{2} (69/sq mi)
- Time zone: UTC+01:00 (CET)
  - Summer (DST): UTC+02:00 (CEST)
- INSEE/Postal code: 02376 /02120
- ^{1} French Land Register data, which excludes lakes, ponds, glaciers > 1 km^{2} (0.386 sq mi or 247 acres) and river estuaries.

Hauteville (French pronunciation: [otvil]) is a commune in the Aisne department and Hauts-de-France region of northern France.

== Population ==
Historical population
Year	Pop.	±% p.a.
1968	215	—
1975	191	−1.68%
1982	161	−2.41%
1990	166	+0.38%
1999	172	+0.40%
2007	180	+0.57%
2012	165	−1.73%
2017	166	+0.12%
2023	189	+2.19%
Source: INSEE

== See also ==
- Communes of the Aisne department
