= Athalya Brenner =

Dutch biblical scholar

- עתליה ברנר
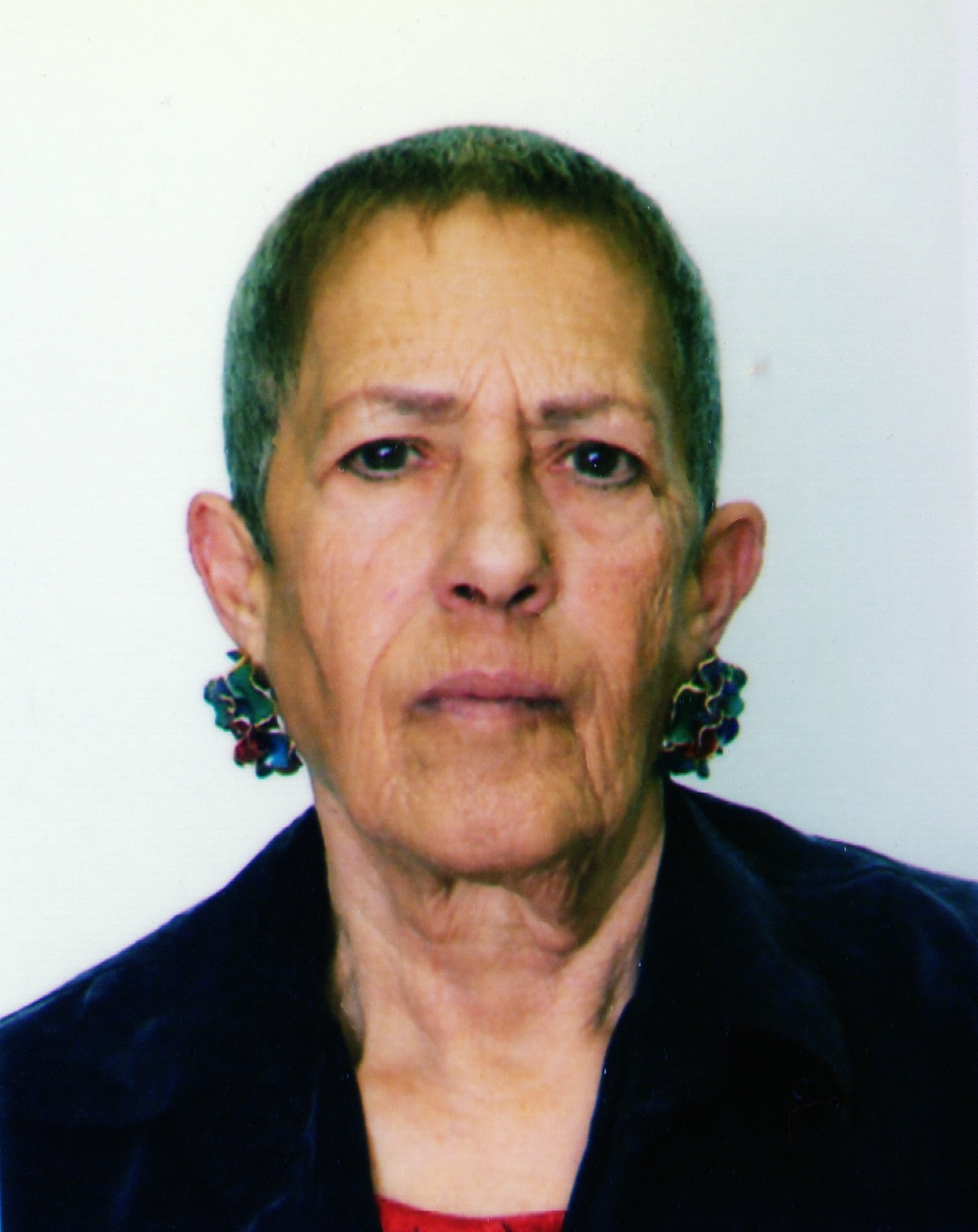
- Born: 17 July 1943 (age 83); Haifa, Israel

Academic background
- Education: Haifa University (BA); Hebrew University of Jerusalem (MA); University of Manchester (PhD)
- Doctoral advisor: James Barr

Athalya Brenner-Idan (Hebrew: עתליה ברנר; born 17 July 1943 in Haifa, Israel) is a Dutch-Israeli biblical scholar known for her contribution to feminist biblical studies.

== Academic career ==
Brenner studied at Haifa University and the Hebrew University of Jerusalem before doing a PhD at the University of Manchester under the supervision of James Barr. She taught for a time at Oranim Academic College.

She is Professor Emerita of Hebrew Bible/Old Testament at the University of Amsterdam and Professor in Biblical Studies at Tel Aviv University. In the Netherlands, she has held posts at Radboud University and the University of Amsterdam, where she is Professor Emerita. She has also taught at Tel Aviv University, Brite Divinity School, and the Chinese University of Hong Kong. She continues to be Extraordinary Professor in the theology faculty at Stellenbosch University as well as a research associate at the Biblia Arabica project of Tel Aviv University.

In 2007, Brenner was described as being at the forefront of feminist biblical studies. Alice Ogden Bellis states in her book I Am: Biblical Women Tell Their Own Stories, that Brenner is "erudite, witty, clever, feisty, and not at all religious."

Brenner was president of the Society of Biblical Literature in 2015. Her presidential address at the society's annual meeting was titled "On Scholarship and Related Animals: A Personal View from and for the Here and Now." Beverly Roberts Gaventa, then Vice-President of the Society of Biblical Literature, introduced Brenner for her presidential address describing her battle with entrenched sex discrimination in the Israeli academy:

"Professor Brenner-Idan undertook her second book, The Israelite Woman: Social Role and Literary Type in Biblical Narrative. Her expectation was that this book, combined with her earlier publications, would secure her promotion to the status of senior lecturer, the equivalent of a tenured associate professor in the American system. The Israelite Woman achieved a great deal in the scholarly world, yet its reception closer to home was anything but welcoming. She was denied promotion on the grounds that 'feminist research was not truly academic, not meaningful, a passing fad and waste of time and energy and money.' When she appealed the decision, a senior administrator dismissively suggested—with a cordial air—that she should consider finding a teaching position in a high school."

She has published dozens of books, articles, and book reviews in the field of Old Testament studies and feminist biblical criticism. She served as editor for the Feminist Companion to the Bible series, the Bible in the 21st Century series, and the Amsterdam Studies in Bible and Religion from Sheffield Academic Press and the Texts@Contexts series from Fortress Press.

She received an honorary doctorate from the University of Bonn in 2002.
