= Dianne Bergant =

Roman Catholic sister

- Born: August 7, 1936
- Education: St. Louis University
- Occupations: Roman Catholic Sister; Theologian

Dianne Bergant is a Roman Catholic sister who has served as President of the Catholic Biblical Association of America (2000-2001). She taught biblical studies to Robert Prevost, who in 2025 became Pope Leo XIV.

In 2024, referring to Pope Francis, she stated that

In the few years that he has been Pope, Pope Francis has written several very important documents. Too few people in the pews even know about these documents, to say nothing of what they say. The pope is the primary teacher of the church. I feel very strongly that parishes and dioceses need programs that explain this teaching of the Holy Father.

Bergant, a native of Milwaukee, is a member of the Congregation of Sisters of Saint Agnes, a Roman Catholic order. As of July, 2025, she was living with members of that order in Fond du Lac, Wisconsin. Referring to the then-newly-elected Pope Leo XIV, she said that

I helped that young man to learn how to interpret the Bible. What do you say to that? ... That doesn’t make me a good teacher, but I know I left my mark in his thinking. I am awed by that.
