= Five Megillot =

Group of five Jewish scriptures

The Five Scrolls or the Five Megillot (Hebrew: חמש מגילות [χaˈmeʃ meɡiˈlot], Hamesh Megillot or Chomeish Megillos) are parts of the Ketuvim ("Writings"), the third major section of the Tanakh (Hebrew Bible). The Five Scrolls are the Song of Songs, the Book of Ruth, the Book of Lamentations, Ecclesiastes and the Book of Esther. These five relatively short biblical books are grouped together in Jewish tradition.

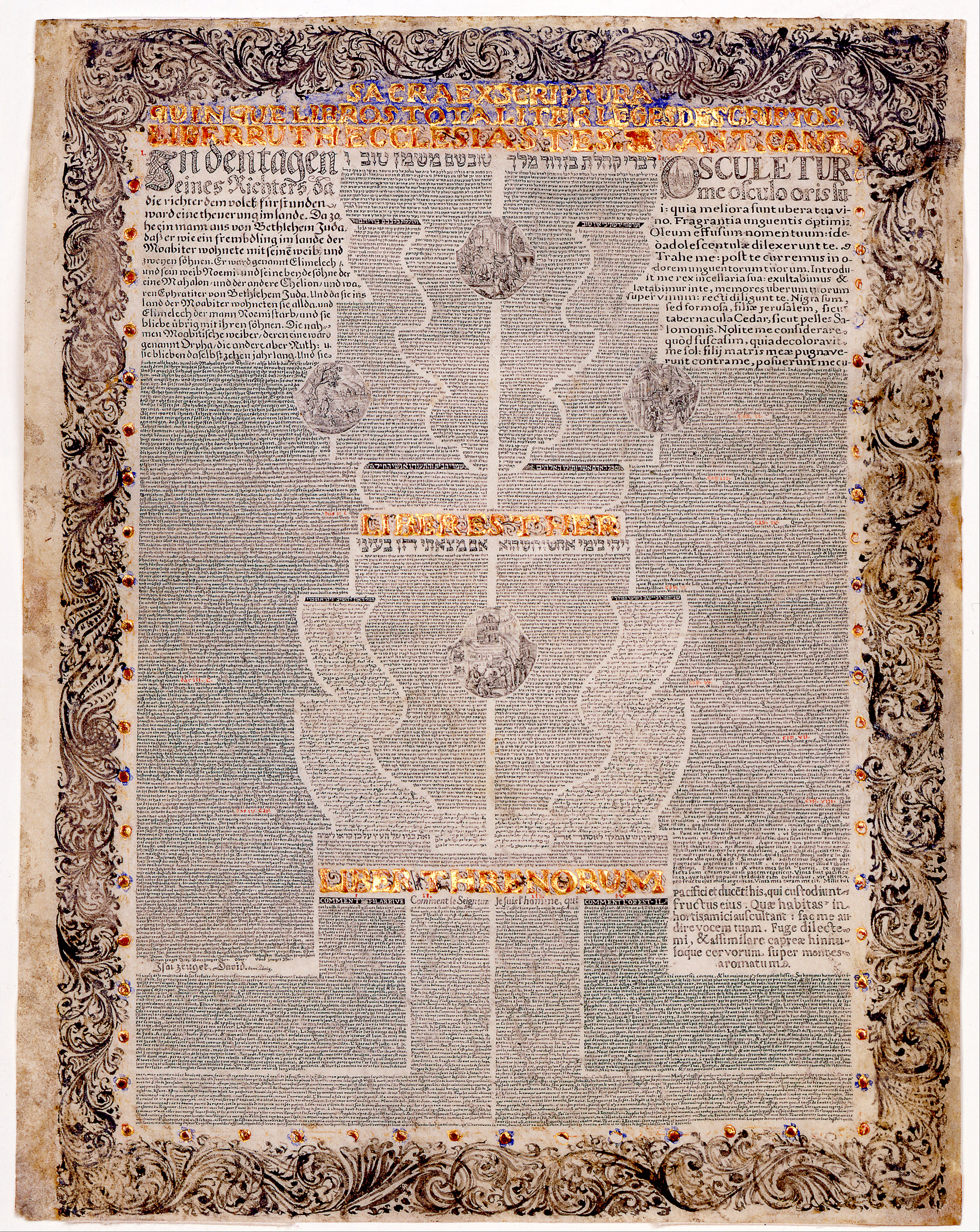
The five megillot in multilingual micrography (Latin and Hebrew) by Aaron Wolf Herlingen, 1748

== History ==
An early testimony that these five scrolls were grouped together is in the Midrash Rabba. This midrash was compiled on the Pentateuch and on the Five Scrolls.

== Liturgical use ==
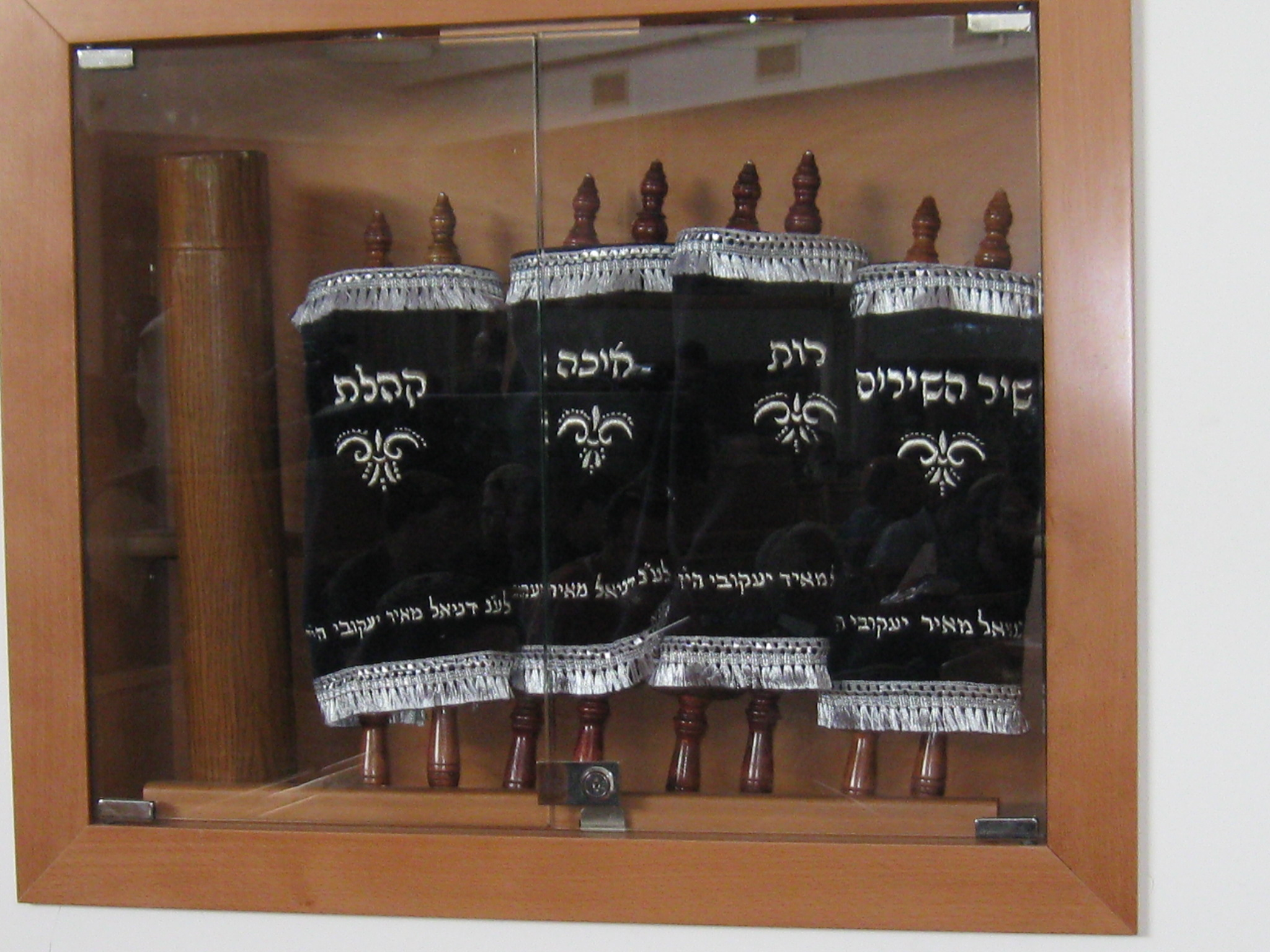
A cabinet containing the five megillot in order from right to left. (Esther is in the wooden case on the left.)

All five of these megillot ("scrolls") are traditionally read publicly in the synagogue over the course of the year in many Jewish communities. In common printed editions of the Tanakh they appear in the order that they are read in the synagogue on holidays (beginning with Passover).

=== Song of Songs ===
The Song of Songs (Hebrew: שיר השירים Shir ha-Shirim) is read publicly in some communities, especially by Ashkenazim, on the Sabbath of Passover. In most Mizrahi Jewish communities it is read publicly each week at the onset of the Shabbat (Sabbath). There is also a widespread custom to read it at the end of the Passover Seder.

In the Sephardi ritual it is read before the Mincha service on the afternoon of the seventh day of Passover (eighth day outside Israel). Italian Jews read it at the Maariv (Evening Prayer) of the first and second day of Passover.

=== Ruth ===
The Book of Ruth (רות) is read in some communities, especially by Ashkenazim, before the reading of the Torah on the morning of Shavuot. Others read it in the Tikkun at night, or not at all.

=== Lamentations ===
The Book of Lamentations (איכה Eikhah or Kinnot) is read on the night of Tisha B'Av in all Jewish communities.

=== Ecclesiastes ===
Ecclesiastes (קהלת Kohelet) is read publicly in some communities, especially by Ashkenazim, on the Sabbath of Sukkot. In other communities it is not read at all.

=== Esther ===
The Book of Esther (אסתר) is read in all Jewish communities on Purim. The public reading is done twice, on the evening of Purim and once again the next morning.

=== Common practice ===
When read in the synagogue, these five books are sung with cantillation (see below). In most communities, Esther is the only book accompanied by blessings before and after, but certain communities adopted the custom of the Vilna Gaon to recite blessings before the other four megillot as well.

As indicated above, however, only two of the megillot are traditionally read in all Jewish communities, Esther on Purim and Lamentations on Tisha B'Av. The practice of reading the other three books on the Three Pilgrimage Festivals is widespread but by no means universal. To read them is a venerable custom among Ashkenazim, but some Sephardic Jews do not associate the three books with the three festivals.

== Cantillation ==
The cantillation marks which guide the singing of the text written in the printed texts of the Five Scrolls are drawn from the same set of markings as the notes in the Humash (Pentateuch). However, the tune in which they are read varies depending on the scroll. Esther is read in a happier tune than the sad tune of Lamentations. Traditionally, Ecclesiastes, Ruth, and Song of Songs are read with the same festive tune.

== Other uses ==
The term megillah is most widely used for the book of Esther, even though it is applied to the rest as well. The term megillah is also used in a joking way, in reference to any lengthy story.

Eugene H. Peterson's Five Smooth Stones for Pastoral Work examines the application of the Megillot to Christian pastoral theology.

== See also ==
- Torah
- Jonah read during Yom Kippur
