= Ecclesiastes 10 =

Tenth chapter of the biblical book Ecclesiastes

- ← chapter 9 chapter 11 →
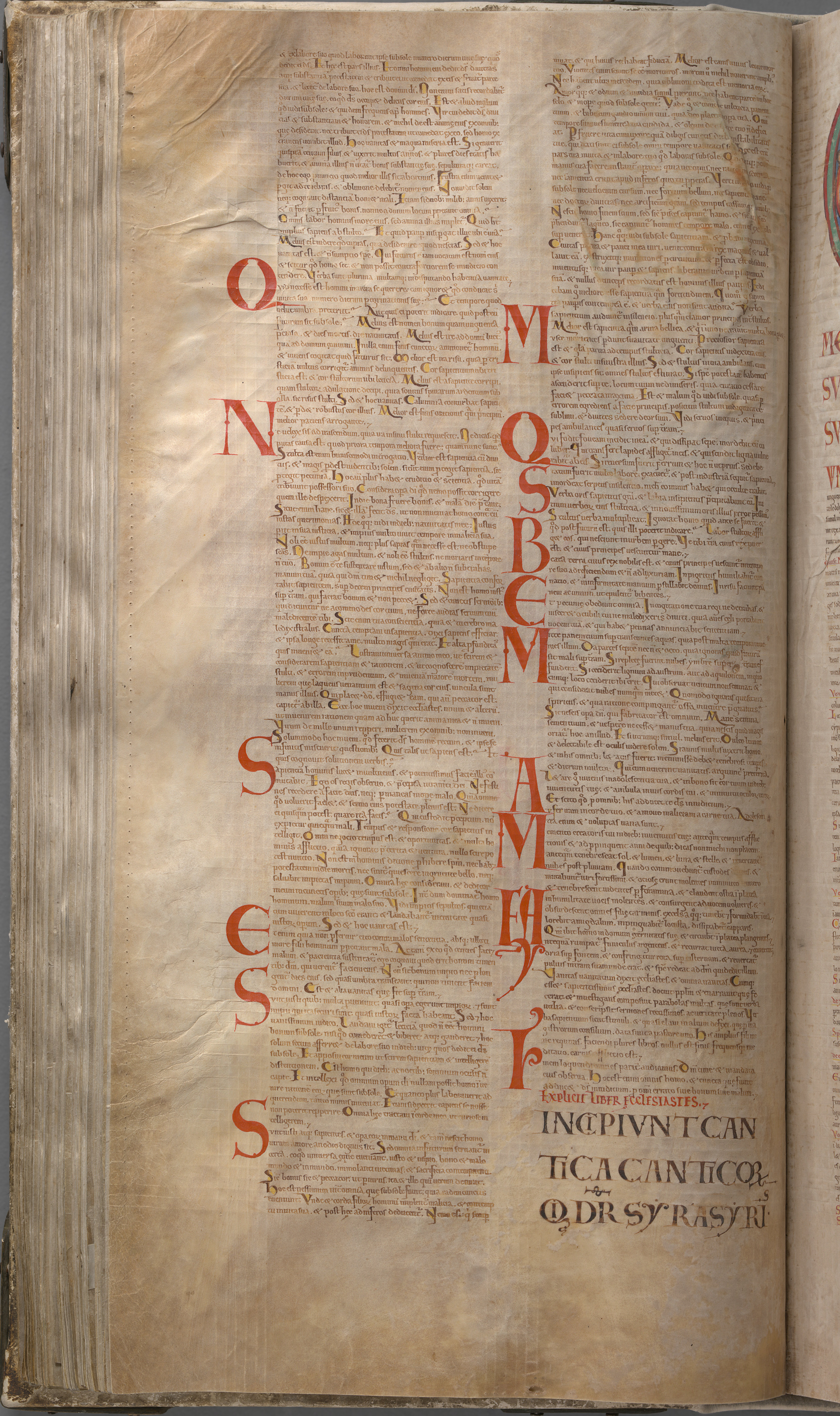
- A page containing Ecclesiastes 5:17-end in Codex Gigas, a Latin translation of 13th century.
- Book: Book of Ecclesiastes
- Category: Ketuvim
- Christian Bible part: Old Testament
- Order in the Christian part: 21

Ecclesiastes 10 is the tenth chapter of the Book of Ecclesiastes in the Hebrew Bible or the Old Testament of the Christian Bible. The book contains philosophical speeches by a character called '(the) Qoheleth' ("the Teacher"), composed probably between the 5th and 2nd centuries BCE. Peshitta, Targum, and Talmud attribute the authorship of the book to King Solomon. This chapter focuses on foolishness in persons, in high places, in action, in words and even in national life.

== Text ==
The original text was written in Hebrew. This chapter is divided into 20 verses.

=== Textual witnesses ===
Some early manuscripts containing the text of this chapter in Hebrew are of the Masoretic Text, which includes Codex Leningradensis (1008). (Note: Since the anti-Jewish riots in Aleppo in 1947 the whole book has been missing from the Aleppo Codex.)

There is also a translation into Koine Greek known as the Septuagint, made in the last few centuries BCE. Extant ancient manuscripts of the Septuagint version include Codex Vaticanus (B; $\mathfrak{G}$^{B}; 4th century), Codex Sinaiticus (S; BHK: $\mathfrak{G}$^{S}; 4th century), and Codex Alexandrinus (A; $\mathfrak{G}$^{A}; 5th century). The Greek text is probably derived from the work of Aquila of Sinope or his followers.

== Foolishness in personal life (10:1–3) ==
This section speaks of foolishness in the invisible side of one's life, contrasted to face (cf. Ecclesiastes 7:3: "a sad countenance"), hands (Ecclesiastes 7:26: "[a woman's] hands are fetters") or body (cf. Ecclesiastes 11:10: "put away evil from your flesh"). In verse 1 Qoheleth observes the impact of "a little folly" on one otherwise respected for "a great weight of wisdom".

== Foolishness in high places (10:4–7) ==
Folly can be found within the leadership of a nation (verse 5) and results in odd reversals of position and prestige, in a society which Stuart Weeks describes as "topsy-turvy".

=== Verse 4 ===
If a ruler’s anger rises against you, do not leave your post; calmness can lay great offenses to rest.

For "calmness", the New King James Version notes that "healing" or "health" translate the Hebrew more literally. Weeks notes that this verse "probably commends 'soothing' rather than 'calmness'".

== Foolishness in action (10:8–11) ==
Michael Eaton summarises this section as "vindictiveness has its built-in penalties", and "slackness may nullify inherent skill". Precautionary measures using wisdom can avert accidents, but are of no use when it is too late (as with snakes that were not charmed before).

=== Verse 9 ===
He who quarries stones may be hurt by them,
And he who splits wood may be endangered by it.

- People who quarry stones or who split logs of wood are vulnerable to occupational hazards.

== Foolishness in words (10:12–15) ==
Spoken words can be a test of wisdom, as the ones from the wise can be helpful, but the foolish ones originate from the foolishness of the heart.

== Foolishness in national life (10:16–20) ==
Qoheleth contrasts the way of disaster (verse 16) and the way of safety (verse 17) in national level. Eating and drinking early on a day indicate self-centered indulgence. Qoheleth does not despise laughter, wine or money, but the point is that "the pleasures of life should not be its total outlook" (verse 19), and one needs "to take life day by day from the hand of God".

== See also ==
- Related Bible parts: Ecclesiastes 2, 3

== Sources ==
- Coogan, Michael David (2007). Coogan, Michael David; Brettler, Marc Zvi; Newsom, Carol Ann; Perkins, Pheme (eds.). The New Oxford Annotated Bible with the Apocryphal/Deuterocanonical Books: New Revised Standard Version, Issue 48 (Augmented 3rd ed.). Oxford University Press. ISBN 9780195288810.
- Eaton, Michael A. (1994). "Ecclesiastes". In Carson, D. A.; France, R. T.; Motyer, J. A.; Wenham, G. J. (eds.). New Bible Commentary: 21st Century Edition (4, illustrated, reprint, revised ed.). Inter-Varsity Press. pp. 609–618. ISBN 9780851106489.
- Halley, Henry H. (1965). Halley's Bible Handbook: an abbreviated Bible commentary (24th (revised) ed.). Zondervan Publishing House. ISBN 0-310-25720-4.
- Weeks, Stuart (2007). "20. Ecclesiastes". In Barton, John; Muddiman, John (eds.). The Oxford Bible Commentary (first (paperback) ed.). Oxford University Press. pp. 423–429. ISBN 978-0199277186.
- Würthwein, Ernst (1995). The Text of the Old Testament. Translated by Rhodes, Erroll F. Grand Rapids, MI: Wm. B. Eerdmans. ISBN 0-8028-0788-7.
