= Ecclesiastes 9 =

Ninth chapter of the biblical book Ecclesiastes

- ← chapter 8 chapter 10 →
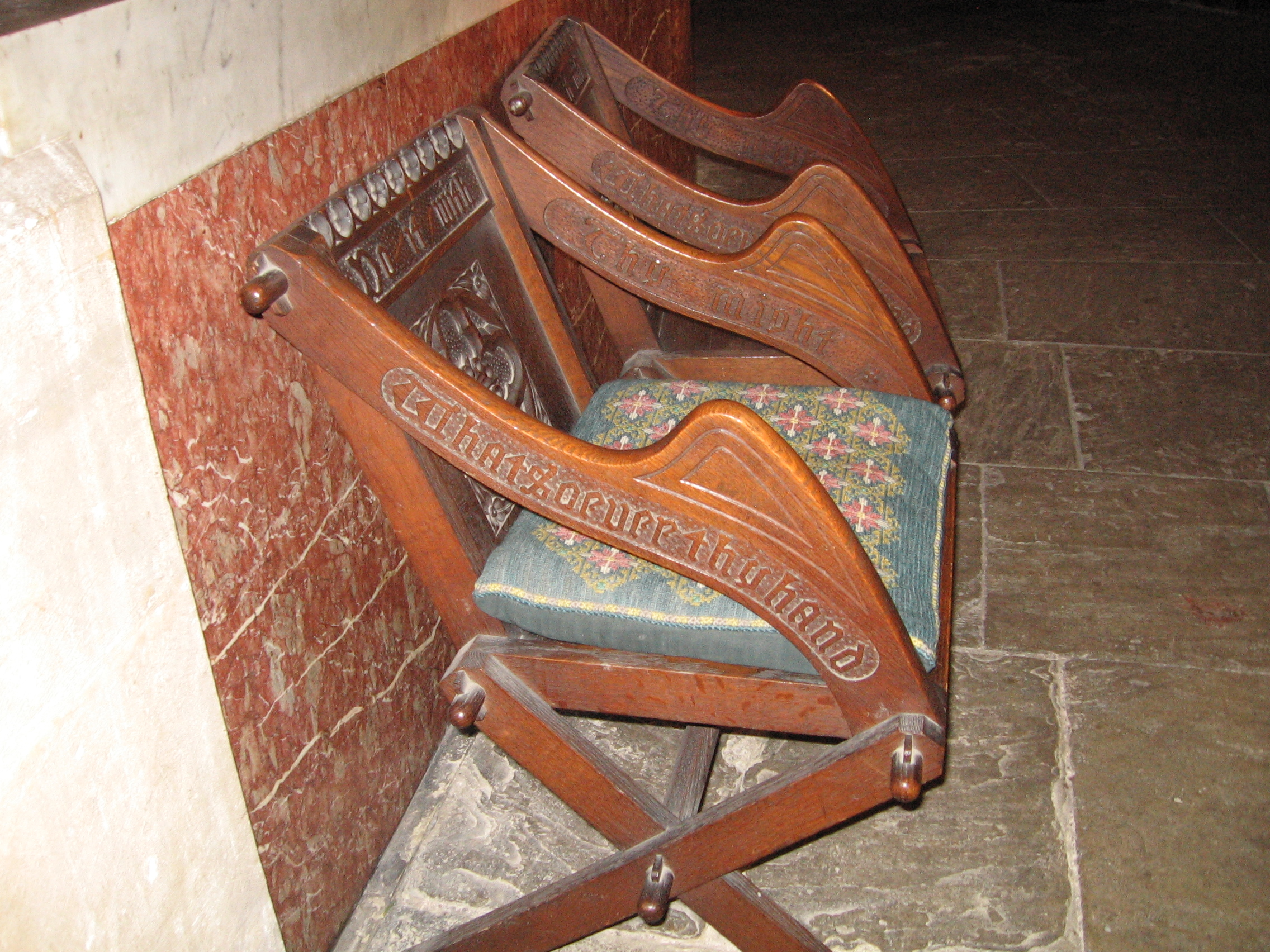
- Saint Finbarre's Cathedral chairs inscribed with the first half of Ecclesiastes 9:10. This portion of the verse is also the open motto of Theta Tau.
- Book: Book of Ecclesiastes
- Category: Ketuvim
- Christian Bible part: Old Testament
- Order in the Christian part: 21

Ecclesiastes 9 is the ninth chapter of the Book of Ecclesiastes in the Hebrew Bible or the Old Testament of the Christian Bible. The book contains the philosophical and theological reflections of a character known as Qoheleth, a title literally meaning "the assembler" but traditionally translated as "the Teacher" or "The Preacher". The identity of Qoheleth is unknown. In traditional Jewish texts such as the Peshitta, Targum, and Talmud, authorship of Ecclesiastes is attributed to King Solomon, due to the statement in Ecclesiastes 1:1 which identifies Qoheleth as the "son of David, king in Jerusalem". However, it is generally agreed upon by contemporary scholars that the book could not have been written in the 10th century during the time of Solomon. It is now thought to be one of the latest books in the Old Testament to be written, likely sometime between the 5th and 3rd centuries BCE.

This chapter brings together some of the book's major themes, namely the shared fate of death, the importance of enjoyment in the midst of an unpredictable world, and the value of wisdom.

== Textual Witnesses ==
The original text was written in Hebrew. This chapter is divided into 18 verses.

Some early manuscripts containing the text of this chapter in Hebrew are of the Masoretic Text, which includes Codex Leningradensis (1008). (Note: Since the anti-Jewish riots in Aleppo in 1947 the whole book has been missing from the Aleppo Codex.)

There is also a translation into Koine Greek known as the Septuagint, made in the last few centuries BCE. Extant ancient manuscripts of the Septuagint version include Codex Vaticanus (B; $\mathfrak{G}$^{B}; 4th century), Codex Sinaiticus (S; BHK: $\mathfrak{G}$^{S}; 4th century), and Codex Alexandrinus (A; $\mathfrak{G}$^{A}; 5th century). The Greek text is probably derived from the work of Aquila of Sinope or his followers.

== Structure ==
The following structure has been provided by biblical scholar Michael V. Fox.

- Ignorance, Death, and Pleasure (9:1–10)
  - Death and Ignorance (9:1–3)
  - Life's Superiority to Death (9:4–6)
  - Life's Pleasures (9:7–10)
- Time and Contingency (9:11–12)
- Wisdom and Folly (9:13–18)

== Ignorance, Death, and Pleasure (9:1–10) ==
The central theme of this section is that death is the fate that ultimately awaits all people. Though traditional wisdom might suggest that one's fate should be determined by how righteously they lived, this does not turn out to be true. Death is the great equalizer. However, for Qoheleth this grim reality is not a reason to fall into nihilism. He instead emphasizes that life is always preferable to death. While the living may know that they are going to die, the dead know nothing at all. Therefore, Qoheleth exhorts his audience to live fully while they still can, finding joy in every moment. Such pleasures will no longer be possible in the realm of Sheol. Although Sheol has often been mistakenly equated with the hell of later Judaism and Christianity, it is more accurately described as a "place of non-being where all consciousness and all passions have ceased." Enjoyment passages like verses 7-10 are strategically placed throughout Ecclesiastes. Though some have claimed that these exhortations of joy are hedonistic or naïve, they are better understood as recognitions of life's possibilities even in the midst of its uncertainties and inexplicable contradictions. To experience joy is not to deny the pain and confusion of life but to appreciate the small pleasures within it.

=== Verse 1 ===
For I considered all this in my heart, so that I could declare it all: that the righteous and the wise and their works are in the hand of God. People know neither love nor hatred by anything they see before them.

This verse mentions "the righteous", but taken with verse 2 it is clear that "the wicked" are also in the hands of God. Methodist writer Joseph Benson suggests that they are mentioned "not exclusively, ... but eminently because, by the course of God's providence toward them, they might seem to be quite neglected by God".

== Time and Contingency (9:11–12) ==
In this section, Qoheleth presents his observations about the unpredictability of life, making the claim that people cannot know what will happen to them. In the words of Michael V. Fox, "everyone is subject to the vagaries of chance and fortune, which can nullify the advantages of talents and efforts." There is no reliable connection between one's efforts and what one receives, and this absurdity characterizes life. Qoheleth, therefore, breaks down all of the assurances of success to which people cling. Time and chance ruin any certainty that one will get the outcome that they deserve.

== Wisdom and Folly (9:13–18) ==
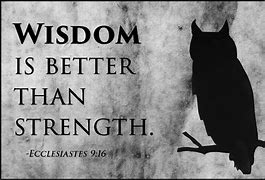
"Wisdom is better than strength" from Ecclesiastes 9:16.

In this section, Qoheleth returns to the topic of wisdom (a discussion that continues through 11:6). Verses 13-16 tell the story of a poor, wise man who saved a city from being sieged by a powerful king but was not recognized or remembered for his work. The final two verses serve as Qoheleth's response to this story, in which he seems to be quoting traditional wisdom sayings. Here, he seems to be holding two seemingly contradictory statements in tension with one another: wisdom is both vulnerable and powerful. Though wisdom is ultimately of tremendous importance, one cannot expect that wisdom will be met with reward. As is characteristic of Qoheleth's reflections throughout Ecclesiastes, realism rather than untenable optimism or pessimism is encouraged.

== See also ==
- Related Bible parts: Ecclesiastes 3, 4

== Sources ==
- Coogan, Michael David (2007). Coogan, Michael David; Brettler, Marc Zvi; Newsom, Carol Ann; Perkins, Pheme (eds.). The New Oxford Annotated Bible with the Apocryphal/Deuterocanonical Books: New Revised Standard Version, Issue 48 (Augmented 3rd ed.). Oxford University Press. ISBN 9780195288810.
- Eaton, Michael A. (1994). "Ecclesiastes". In Carson, D. A.; France, R. T.; Motyer, J. A.; Wenham, G. J. (eds.). New Bible Commentary: 21st Century Edition (4, illustrated, reprint, revised ed.). Inter-Varsity Press. pp. 609–618. ISBN 9780851106489.
- Halley, Henry H. (1965). Halley's Bible Handbook: an abbreviated Bible commentary (24th (revised) ed.). Zondervan Publishing House. ISBN 0-310-25720-4.
- Weeks, Stuart (2007). "20. Ecclesiastes". In Barton, John; Muddiman, John (eds.). The Oxford Bible Commentary (first (paperback) ed.). Oxford University Press. pp. 423–429. ISBN 978-0199277186.
- Würthwein, Ernst (1995). The Text of the Old Testament. Translated by Rhodes, Erroll F. Grand Rapids, MI: Wm. B. Eerdmans. ISBN 0-8028-0788-7.
