= Ecclesiastes 5 =

Fifth chapter of the biblical book Ecclesiastes

- ← chapter 4 chapter 6 →
- A handwritten Hebrew scroll of Ecclesiastes by the scribe Elihu Shannon of Kibbutz Saad, Israel (c. 2005)
- Book: Book of Ecclesiastes
- Category: Ketuvim
- Christian Bible part: Old Testament
- Order in the Christian part: 21

Ecclesiastes 5 is the fifth chapter of the Book of Ecclesiastes in the Hebrew Bible or the Old Testament of the Christian Bible. The book contains philosophical speeches by a character called '(the) Qoheleth' ("the Teacher"), composed probably between the fifth and second centuries BCE. Peshitta, Targum, and Talmud attribute the authorship of the book to King Solomon. This chapter contains advice on how to approach God the right way, and a discussion about poverty and wealth.

== Text ==
The original text was written in Hebrew. This chapter is divided into 19 or 20 verses. (Note: The final verse of Ecclesiastes 4 in Hebrew texts appears in most English translations as the first verse of Ecclesiastes 5, with that chapter's subsequent verse numbers incremented accordingly. The New American Bible notably maintains the verse in Ecclesiastes 4.)

=== Textual witnesses ===
Some early manuscripts containing the text of this chapter in Hebrew are of the Masoretic Text, which includes Codex Leningradensis (1008). (Note: Since the anti-Jewish riots in Aleppo in 1947 the whole book has been missing from the Aleppo Codex.) Fragments containing parts of this chapter were found among the Dead Sea Scrolls 4QQoh^{a} (4Q109; 175-150 BCE; extant verses 13–17).

There is also a translation into Koine Greek known as the Septuagint, made in the last few centuries BCE. Extant ancient manuscripts of the Septuagint version include Codex Vaticanus (B; $\mathfrak{G}$^{B}; 4th century), Codex Sinaiticus (S; BHK: $\mathfrak{G}$^{S}; 4th century), and Codex Alexandrinus (A; $\mathfrak{G}$^{A}; 5th century). The Greek text is probably derived from the work of Aquila of Sinope or his followers.

== Structure ==
Stuart Weeks treats verses 1-9 as a section dealing with "fear of God", and connects verses 10-20 and 6:1-12 as a section dealing with "the problems and inadequacies of wealth". The New King James Version has two sections:

- Ecclesiastes 5:1–7 = Fear God, Keep Your Vows
- Ecclesiastes 5:8–20 = The Vanity of Gain and Honor

The New International Version divides the verses in a similar pattern. In Hebrew texts, verse 1 is numbered 4:17, and verses 2-20 are numbered as 5:1-19.

== The approach to God (5:1–7) ==
The lack of solution in chapter 4 on the theme of companionship leads the reader to consider whether God is the answer, and this part shows how to approach God in the right way.

=== Verse 7 ===
For in the multitude of dreams and many words there is also vanity. But fear God.

- "Fear God" here is used in its literal sense, just as respect and awe before God can be found to be central values in wisdom literature.

== The poor under oppressive bureaucracy (5:8–9) ==
Weeks suggests these two verses are "notoriously difficult". Qoheleth points to the frustration of the poor facing delays to obtain justice due to oppressive bureaucracy and tiers of hierarchy. "He that is higher than the highest regardeth" (KJV), from Hebrew גבה מעל גבה שמר ḡā-ḇō-ah mê-‘al ḡā-ḇō-ah shō-mêr,, is also translated as "the high official is watched by a higher" (NRSV), not referring to an official of any government bureaucracy, but rather ambitious people who strive to be higher than others. However, there will always people higher than those, ultimately pointing to God as the highest one.

== The problems and inadequacies of wealth (5:10–20) ==
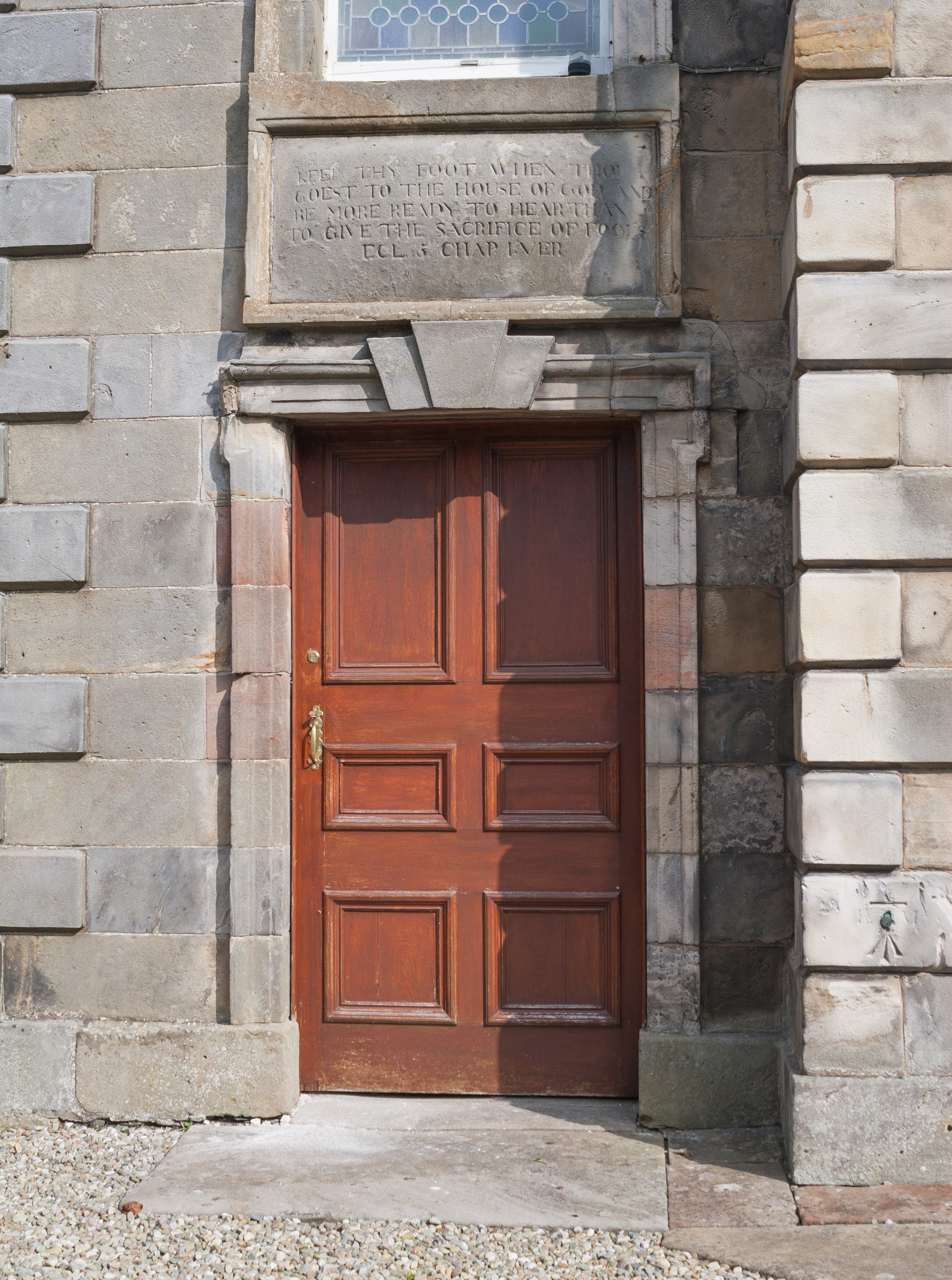
A quote of Ecclesiastes 5:1 engraved above the left entrance door at the west façade of the Holy Trinity Church, Ballycastle, County Antrim, Northern Ireland.

This section starts by stating three concise points about financial greed (verses 10–12): the lover of money never have enough; increasing resources will result in bigger financial commitments; more wealth causes less peace. The rich man could not pass any of the wealth to their offsprings (verse 14) nor take anything to the next life (verse 15). The whole passage of 5:8 to 6:9 is arranged as such that the outer sections will point to the center at verse 20. Qoheleth reiterates his earlier conclusion that God's gift is the ability to find enjoyment in the wealth, which keep humans occupied in life, so that "they should not much call to mind the days of their lives".

=== Verse 20 ===
For he will not much remember the days of his life because God keeps him occupied with joy in his heart.

As God gives joy to people as the antidote to their obsessions, people should not think too much ahead but to enjoy the present. That capacity for enjoyment of God's other gifts is also a gift of God, a theme which Qoheleth develops in chapter 6. E. H. Plumptre offers "a satisfying meaning":

The man who has learnt the secret of enjoyment is not anxious about the days of his life, does not brood even over its transitoriness, but takes each day tranquilly, as it comes, as God’s gift to him.

== See also ==
- Related Bible parts: Ecclesiastes 2

== Sources ==
- Coogan, Michael David (2007). Coogan, Michael David; Brettler, Marc Zvi; Newsom, Carol Ann; Perkins, Pheme (eds.). The New Oxford Annotated Bible with the Apocryphal/Deuterocanonical Books: New Revised Standard Version, Issue 48 (Augmented 3rd ed.). Oxford University Press. ISBN 9780195288810.
- Eaton, Michael A. (1994). "Ecclesiastes". In Carson, D. A.; France, R. T.; Motyer, J. A.; Wenham, G. J. (eds.). New Bible Commentary: 21st Century Edition (4, illustrated, reprint, revised ed.). Inter-Varsity Press. pp. 609–618. ISBN 9780851106489.
- Halley, Henry H. (1965). Halley's Bible Handbook: an abbreviated Bible commentary (24th (revised) ed.). Zondervan Publishing House. ISBN 0-310-25720-4.
- Weeks, Stuart (2007). "20. Ecclesiastes". In Barton, John; Muddiman, John (eds.). The Oxford Bible Commentary (first (paperback) ed.). Oxford University Press. pp. 423–429. ISBN 978-0199277186.
- Würthwein, Ernst (1995). The Text of the Old Testament. Translated by Rhodes, Erroll F. Grand Rapids, MI: Wm. B. Eerdmans. ISBN 0-8028-0788-7.
