= Ecclesiastes 8 =

Eighth chapter of the biblical book Ecclesiastes

- ← chapter 7 chapter 9 →
- Hebrew Bible, MS Sassoon 1053, images 464-467 (Ecclesiastes).
- Book: Book of Ecclesiastes
- Category: Ketuvim
- Christian Bible part: Old Testament
- Order in the Christian part: 21

Ecclesiastes 8 is the eighth chapter of the Book of Ecclesiastes in the Hebrew Bible or the Old Testament of the Christian Bible. The book contains philosophical speeches by a character called '(the) Qoheleth' ("the Teacher"), composed probably between the 5th and 2nd centuries BCE. Peshitta, Targum, and Talmud attribute the authorship of the book to King Solomon. This chapter concerns human and divine authority with the advice that fearing God is the wisest course.

== Text ==
The original text was written in Hebrew. This chapter is divided into 17 verses.

=== Textual witnesses ===
Some early manuscripts containing the text of this chapter in Hebrew are of the Masoretic Text, which includes Codex Leningradensis (1008). (Note: Since the anti-Jewish riots in Aleppo in 1947 the whole book has been missing from the Aleppo Codex.)

There is also a translation into Koine Greek known as the Septuagint, made in the last few centuries BCE. Extant ancient manuscripts of the Septuagint version include Codex Vaticanus (B; $\mathfrak{G}$^{B}; 4th century), Codex Sinaiticus (S; BHK: $\mathfrak{G}$^{S}; 4th century), and Codex Alexandrinus (A; $\mathfrak{G}$^{A}; 5th century). The Greek text is probably derived from the work of Aquila of Sinope or his followers.

== Structure ==
The New King James Version has two sections within this chapter:

- Ecclesiastes 8:1–8 = Obey Authorities for God's Sake
- Ecclesiastes 8:9–17 = Death Comes to All

== Royal authority (8:1–9) ==
Verse 1 closes the theme from chapter 7. and may be read as part of that section, leaving verses 2-9 as a group dealing with authority. Qoheleth then uses the previous observation of human authority to form a basis for understanding the divine authority but Weeks notes that verses 2 and 3 present "several difficulties", and their sentence division is unclear.

=== Verse 1 ===
Who is like the wise?

And who knows the interpretation of a thing?

A man's wisdom makes his face shine,

and the hardness of his face is changed.

- "Make his face shine": in the Jerusalem Talmud, a story is related on how Rabbi Abbahu went down to Tiberias. [When he arrived there], the students of Rabbi Johanan noticed that his face was aglow. They then said to their master, Rabbi Johanan, that Rabbi Abbahu had presumably found a treasure. He responded to them, saying: "Why do you say so?" They replied to him: "It is because his face is all-shining." He said to them: "Perhaps it is because he heard a new instruction out of the Book of the Law." He went unto him, and enquired: "What new instruction have you heard out of the Law?" He said to him: "It was an old Tosefta." He then said concerning him: "A man's wisdom makes his face to shine" (Ecclesiastes 8:1).
- "Hardness" (KJV: "boldness"; NKJV: "sternness"): literally, "strength".

== Fearing God is the wisest course (8:10–17) ==
Echoing the idea in Ecclesiastes 3:16–17, Qoheleth affirms that it is still 'safer to stand in fear before God', even as the righteous are sometimes regarded as wicked and the punishment of the wicked seems lacking.

=== Verse 15 ===
So I commended enjoyment, because a man has nothing better under the sun than to eat, drink, and be merry; for this will remain with him in his labor all the days of his life which God gives him under the sun.

"To eat, drink, and be merry" refers to Ecclesiastes 2:23-24; 3:13; 5:18-20; 9:7, as the remedy that Qoheleth offers, that is, to accept God's gift and place oneself in his hands.

== See also ==
- Related Bible parts: Numbers 6

== Sources ==
- Coogan, Michael David (2007). Coogan, Michael David; Brettler, Marc Zvi; Newsom, Carol Ann; Perkins, Pheme (eds.). The New Oxford Annotated Bible with the Apocryphal/Deuterocanonical Books: New Revised Standard Version, Issue 48 (Augmented 3rd ed.). Oxford University Press. ISBN 9780195288810.
- Eaton, Michael A. (1994). "Ecclesiastes". In Carson, D. A.; France, R. T.; Motyer, J. A.; Wenham, G. J. (eds.). New Bible Commentary: 21st Century Edition (4, illustrated, reprint, revised ed.). Inter-Varsity Press. pp. 609–618. ISBN 9780851106489.
- Halley, Henry H. (1965). Halley's Bible Handbook: an abbreviated Bible commentary (24th (revised) ed.). Zondervan Publishing House. ISBN 0-310-25720-4.
- Weeks, Stuart (2007). "20. Ecclesiastes". In Barton, John; Muddiman, John (eds.). The Oxford Bible Commentary (first (paperback) ed.). Oxford University Press. pp. 423–429. ISBN 978-0199277186.
- Würthwein, Ernst (1995). The Text of the Old Testament. Translated by Rhodes, Erroll F. Grand Rapids, MI: Wm. B. Eerdmans. ISBN 0-8028-0788-7.
