= Ecclesiastes 12 =

Twelfth chapter of the biblical book Ecclesiastes

- ← chapter 11 Song of Songs 1 →
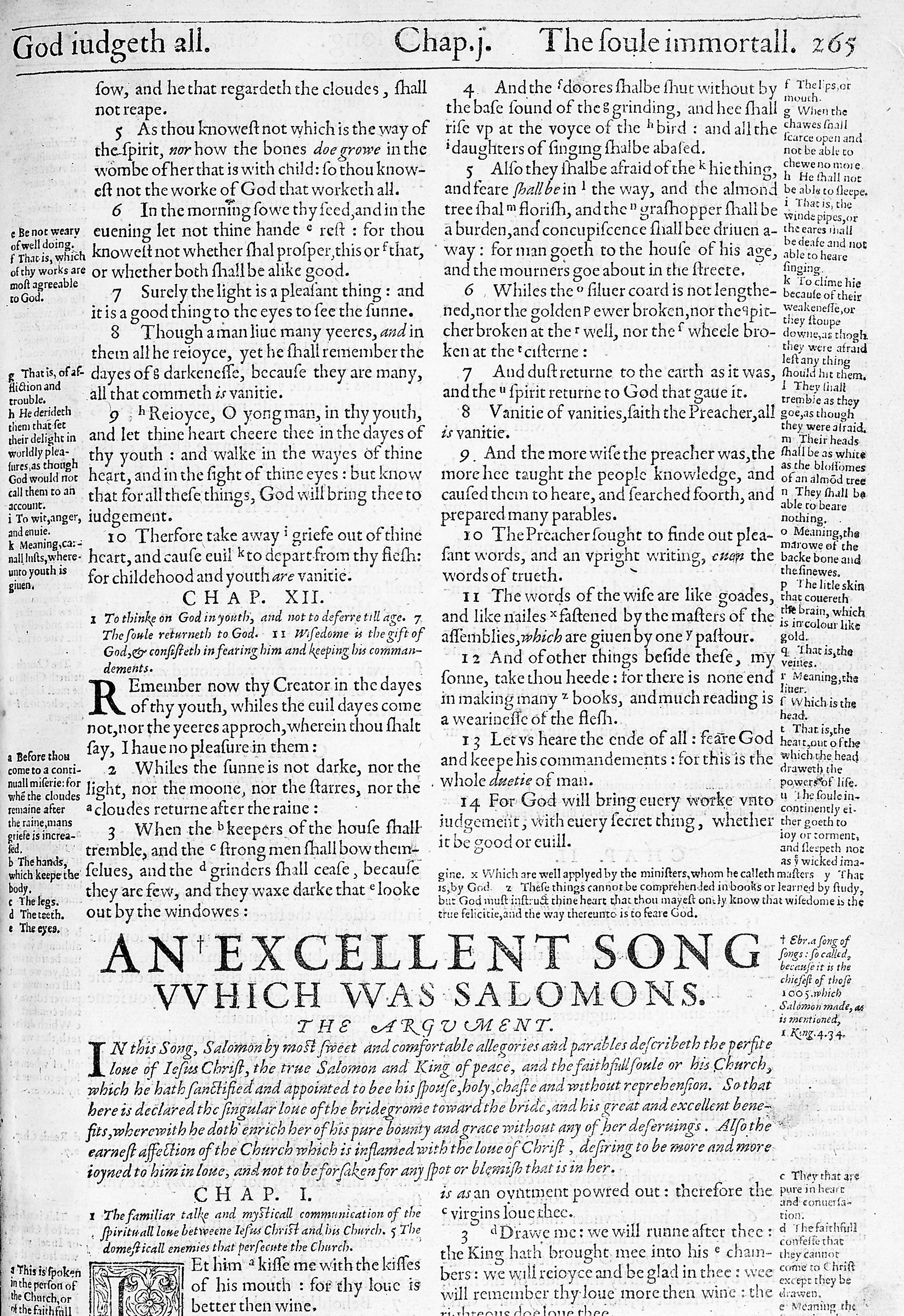
- Ecclesiastes 12 in a family Bible, bound with the Book of Common Prayer, 1607.
- Book: Book of Ecclesiastes
- Category: Ketuvim
- Christian Bible part: Old Testament
- Order in the Christian part: 21

Ecclesiastes 12 is the twelfth (and the final) chapter of the Book of Ecclesiastes in the Hebrew Bible or the Old Testament of the Christian Bible. The book contains philosophical speeches by a character called 'Qoheleth' ("the Teacher"), composed probably between the 5th and 2nd centuries BCE. Peshitta, Targum, and Talmud attribute the authorship of the book to King Solomon. This chapter continues the previous one in the sustained encouragement to make decision and the need to act speedily.

== Text ==
The original text was written in Hebrew. This chapter is divided into 14 verses.

=== Textual witnesses ===
Some early manuscripts containing the text of this chapter in Hebrew are of the Masoretic Text, which includes Codex Leningradensis (1008). (Note: Since the anti-Jewish riots in Aleppo in 1947 the whole book has been missing from the Aleppo Codex.)

There is also a translation into Koine Greek known as the Septuagint, made in the last few centuries BCE. Extant ancient manuscripts of the Septuagint version include Codex Vaticanus (B; $\mathfrak{G}$^{B}; 4th century), Codex Sinaiticus (S; BHK: $\mathfrak{G}$^{S}; 4th century), and Codex Alexandrinus (A; $\mathfrak{G}$^{A}; 5th century). The Greek text is probably derived from the work of Aquila of Sinope or his followers.

== Structure ==
The New King James Version divides this chapter into two parts:

- Ecclesiastes 12:1–8 = Seek God in early life
- Ecclesiastes 12:9–14 = The whole duty of man

Weeks and Eaton see verses 1–8 as a continuation of chapter 11. Verses 9–14 constitute an epilogue to the whole book.

== The urgency of decision (12:1–8) ==
This part reminds the people to look not only to the life of joy but also to its Creator. Verses 2–7 are considered to contain metaphorical and picturesque descriptions of the physical degeneration accompanying old age, until the end of life, depicted as the end of the world, all in one Hebrew sentence (verses 1–7). There is a Sumerian poem applying the same style to the same topic.

=== Verse 1 ===
Remember also your Creator in the days of your youth, before the evil days come and the years draw near of which you will say, "I have no pleasure in them";

- "Creator": provides a link to the creation in verse 7. The "evil" days are rendered as the "difficult" days by the New King James Version.

=== Verse 6 ===
before the silver cord is snapped, or the golden bowl is broken, or the pitcher is broken at the fountain, or the wheel broken at the cistern

=== Verse 7 ===
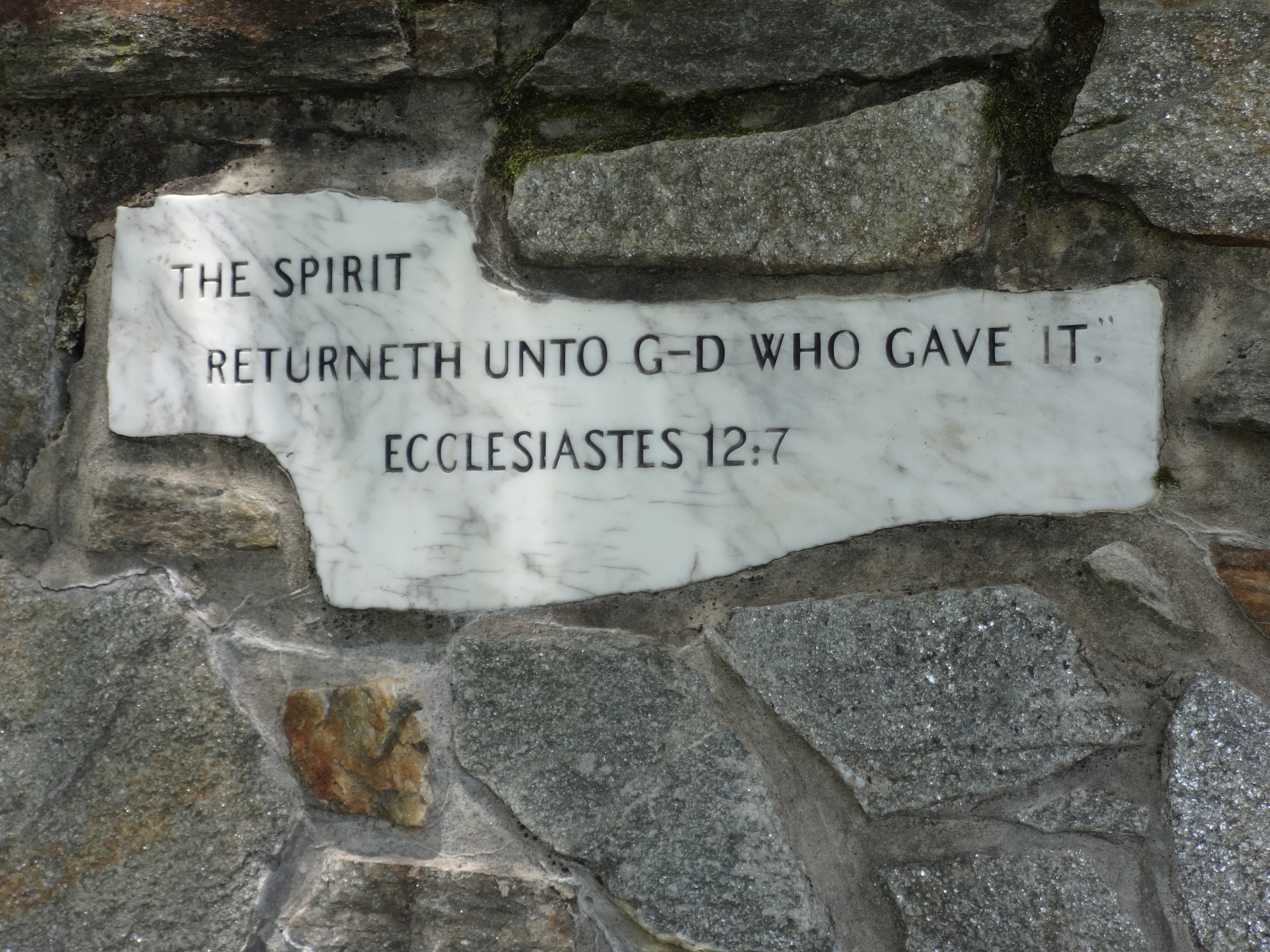
Ecclesiastes 12:7 at Beth Jacob Cemetery, Finksburg, Carroll County, Maryland.

Then shall the dust return to the earth as it was: and the spirit shall return unto God who gave it.

This verse certainly depicts death, echoing Genesis 2:7; 3:19.

=== Verse 8 ===
Vanity of vanities, saith the preacher; all is vanity.

This verse and Ecclesiastes 1:2 with the same words form an inclusio, together framing the body of the book.

== Epilogue (12:9–14) ==
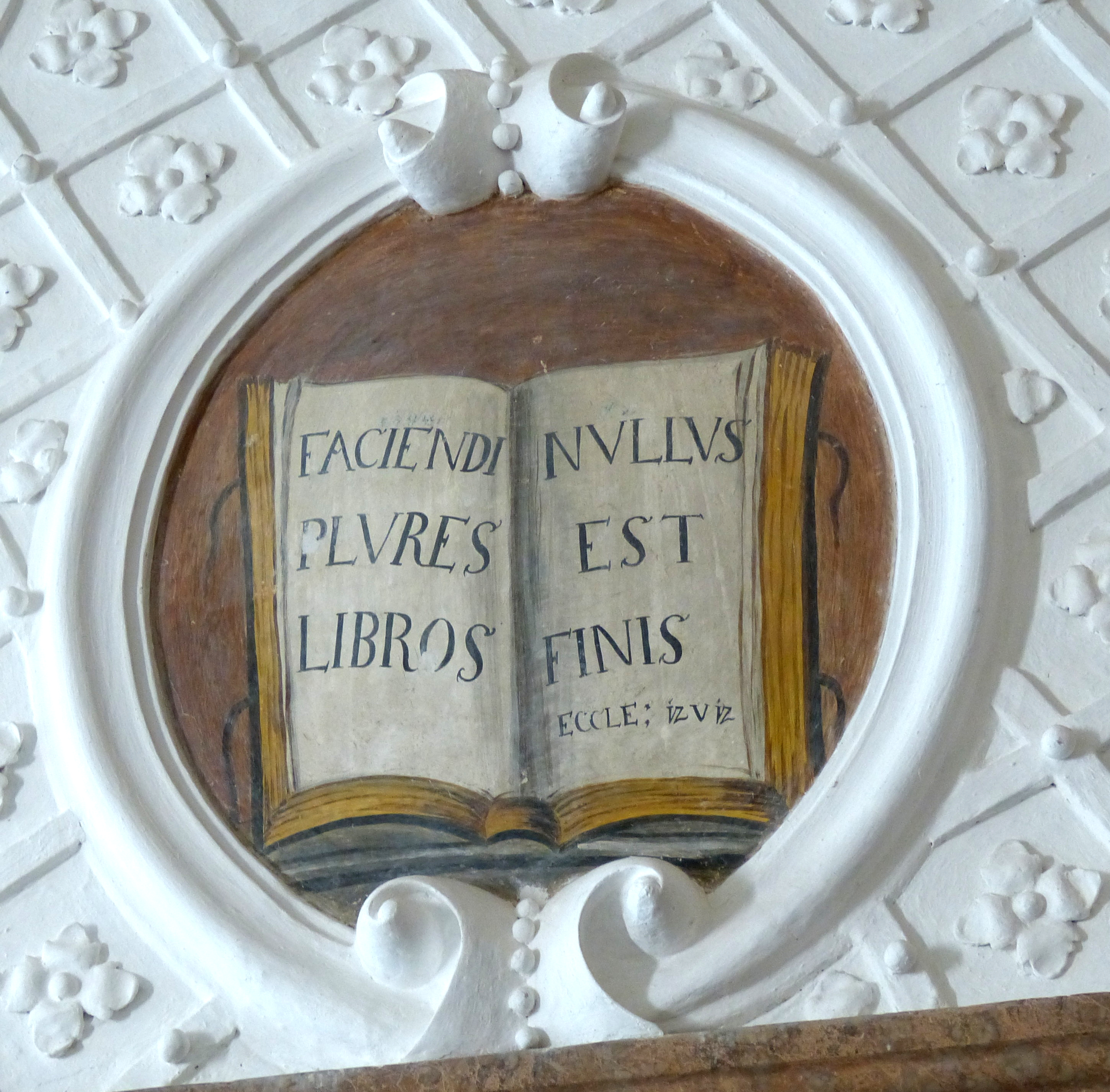
Latin quotation of Ecclesiastes 12:12 above the entrance: "You'll find no end in making books". Herrenchiemsee Abbey (Upper Bavaria). Library hall (1738).

This section provides an assessment and apology for Qoheleth and the book. The final admonition:

^{13} Fear God and keep His commandments, For this is man's all. ^{14} For God will bring every work into judgment, Including every secret thing, Whether good or evil

points to the conclusion in a formula establishing authority of the text, that one should fear God and obey God's commandments, as there will be judgment.

== See also ==
- Related Bible parts: Job 9, Ecclesiastes 1

== Sources ==
- Coogan, Michael David (2007). Coogan, Michael David; Brettler, Marc Zvi; Newsom, Carol Ann; Perkins, Pheme (eds.). The New Oxford Annotated Bible with the Apocryphal/Deuterocanonical Books: New Revised Standard Version, Issue 48 (Augmented 3rd ed.). Oxford University Press. ISBN 9780195288810.
- Eaton, Michael A. (1994). "Ecclesiastes". In Carson, D. A.; France, R. T.; Motyer, J. A.; Wenham, G. J. (eds.). New Bible Commentary: 21st Century Edition (4, illustrated, reprint, revised ed.). Inter-Varsity Press. pp. 609–618. ISBN 9780851106489.
- Halley, Henry H. (1965). Halley's Bible Handbook: an abbreviated Bible commentary (24th (revised) ed.). Zondervan Publishing House. ISBN 0-310-25720-4.
- Weeks, Stuart (2007). "20. Ecclesiastes". In Barton, John; Muddiman, John (eds.). The Oxford Bible Commentary (first (paperback) ed.). Oxford University Press. pp. 423–429. ISBN 978-0199277186.
- Würthwein, Ernst (1995). The Text of the Old Testament. Translated by Rhodes, Erroll F. Grand Rapids, MI: Wm. B. Eerdmans. ISBN 0-8028-0788-7.
