= Ecclesiastes 6 =

Sixth chapter of the biblical book Ecclesiastes

- ← chapter 5 chapter 7 →
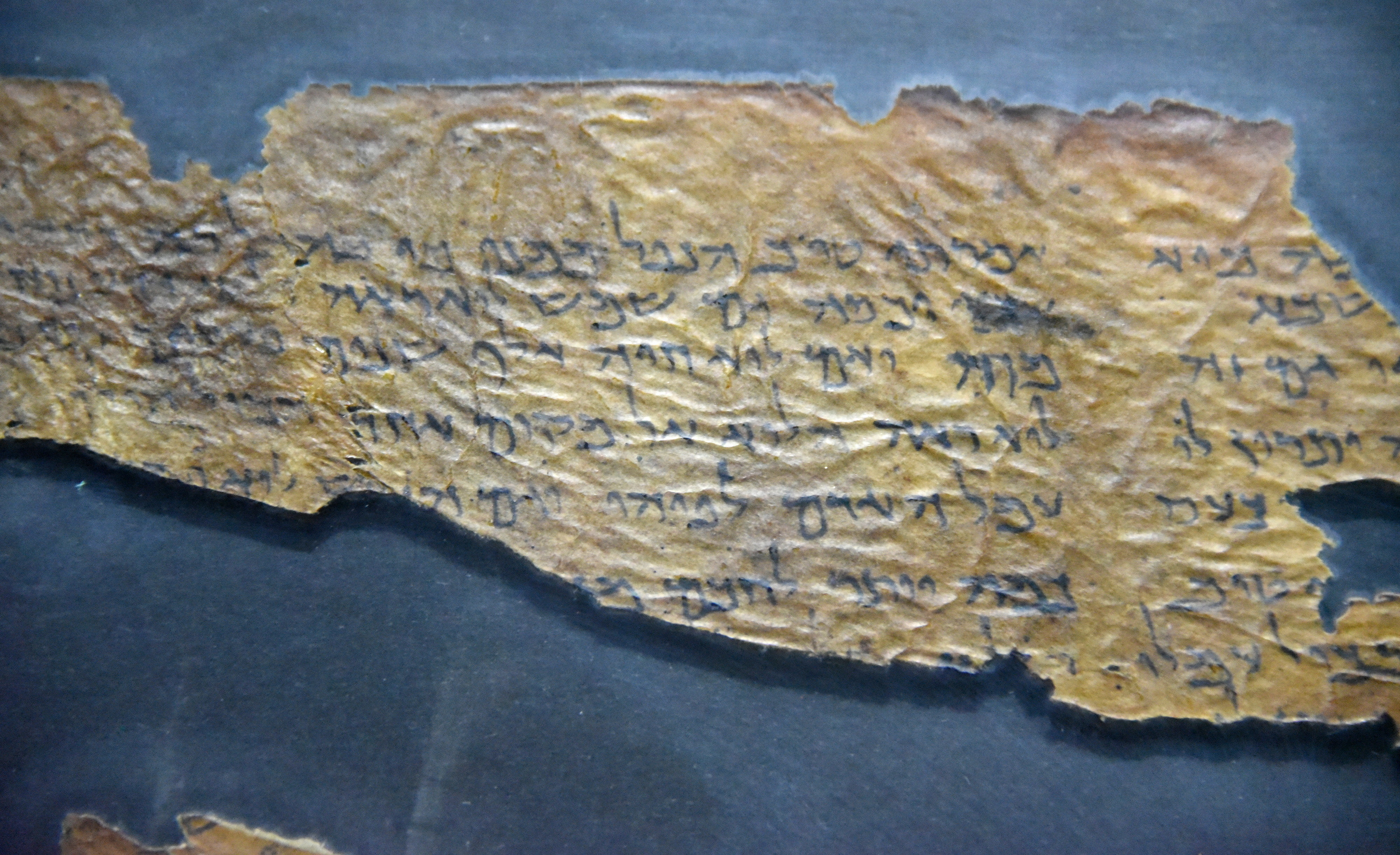
- Ecclesiastes 6:3-8 in Dead Sea Scroll 4Q109 from Qumran Cave 4.
- Book: Book of Ecclesiastes
- Category: Ketuvim
- Christian Bible part: Old Testament
- Order in the Christian part: 21

Ecclesiastes 6 is the sixth chapter of the Book of Ecclesiastes in the Hebrew Bible or the Old Testament of the Christian Bible. The book contains philosophical speeches by a character called '(the) Qoheleth' ("the Teacher"), composed probably between the 5th and 2nd centuries BC. Peshitta, Targum, and Talmud attribute the authorship of the book to King Solomon. This chapter deals with wealth and insatiability.

== Text ==
The original text was written in Hebrew. This chapter is divided into 12 verses. The Latin Vulgate translation has 11 verses, with the final verse carried over to the start of chapter 7.

=== Textual witnesses ===
Some early manuscripts containing the text of this chapter in Hebrew are of the Masoretic Text, which includes Codex Leningradensis (1008). (Note: Since the anti-Jewish riots in Aleppo in 1947 the whole book has been missing from the Aleppo Codex.) Fragments containing parts of this chapter were found among the Dead Sea Scrolls 4QQoh^{a} (4Q109; 175-150 BCE; extant verses 1?, 3–8, 12).

There is also a translation into Koine Greek known as the Septuagint, made in the last few centuries BCE. Extant ancient manuscripts of the Septuagint version include Codex Vaticanus (B; $\mathfrak{G}$^{B}; 4th century), Codex Sinaiticus (S; BHK: $\mathfrak{G}$^{S}; 4th century), and Codex Alexandrinus (A; $\mathfrak{G}$^{A}; 5th century). The Greek text is probably derived from the work of Aquila of Sinope or his followers.

== Wealth and its insecurity (6:1–6) ==
This section focuses on the theme of wealth, to whom God gives it and its trappings, that the rich may live long and have much, but may die unsatisfied and unmourned, while someone else would ultimately enjoy the riches; therefore, they are worse off than a stillborn child, which at least finds rest (verse 6).

=== Verse 3 ===
If a man begets a hundred children and lives many years, so that the days of his years are many, but his soul is not satisfied with goodness, or indeed he has no burial, I say that a stillborn child is better than he.

The Jerusalem Bible (1966) and The Living Bible (1971) both suggest "as many daughters" as preferable translations in place of "lives many years". Retired Baptist minister Peter Pett suggests that, although Psalm 127 celebrates the blessing of many children, the number 100 should be interpreted as "a great many children, more than the norm".

== Insatiable longing (6:7–9) ==
While people work to earn a living, Qoheleth argues that they are left unsatisfied because of the unanswered important questions: what is the point of wisdom, and what reason is there for the poor to find a role in life to improve one's lot? Verse 9 advises for contentment, because the desire to find answers beyond the obvious is seen as "vanity" (hebel).

=== Verse 7 ===
All the labour of man is for his mouth, and yet the appetite is not filled.

- "Appetite" is translated from Hebrew: נפש, nephesh, which can also mean "soul, creature, living being, desire". The insatiability of desire is portrayed like "Sheol", the realm of death in the Hebrew Bible (cf. Isaiah 5:14; Habakkuk 2:5; Proverbs 27:20; 30:16).

== An impasse (6:10–12) ==
This part starts a passage that ends in 7:13–14, insisting that 'no one knows what is good for humanity'. Everything has been defined, so humans are inherently incapable of contesting a cause with the mightier one (verse 10).

=== Verse 10 ===
Whatever happens, it has already been given a name,

and it is known what man is;

he cannot contend with Him who is stronger than he.

- "Name" denotes 'character'. All have settled characters: the world (whatever happens/whatever exists), man and God (one who is stronger than he).
- "Him who is stronger": from Hebrew word שהתקיף, but read as shetaqîp̄, which, despite the passive verb form, clearly points to God who designates and has knowledge.

== See also ==
- Related Bible parts: Job 9

== Sources ==
- Coogan, Michael David (2007). Coogan, Michael David; Brettler, Marc Zvi; Newsom, Carol Ann; Perkins, Pheme (eds.). The New Oxford Annotated Bible with the Apocryphal/Deuterocanonical Books: New Revised Standard Version, Issue 48 (Augmented 3rd ed.). Oxford University Press. ISBN 9780195288810.
- Eaton, Michael A. (1994). "Ecclesiastes". In Carson, D. A.; France, R. T.; Motyer, J. A.; Wenham, G. J. (eds.). New Bible Commentary: 21st Century Edition (4, illustrated, reprint, revised ed.). Inter-Varsity Press. pp. 609–618. ISBN 9780851106489.
- Halley, Henry H. (1965). Halley's Bible Handbook: an abbreviated Bible commentary (24th (revised) ed.). Zondervan Publishing House. ISBN 0-310-25720-4.
- Weeks, Stuart (2007). "20. Ecclesiastes". In Barton, John; Muddiman, John (eds.). The Oxford Bible Commentary (first (paperback) ed.). Oxford University Press. pp. 423–429. ISBN 978-0199277186.
- Würthwein, Ernst (1995). The Text of the Old Testament. Translated by Rhodes, Erroll F. Grand Rapids, MI: Wm. B. Eerdmans. ISBN 0-8028-0788-7.
