= Ecclesiastes 11 =

Eleventh chapter of the biblical book Ecclesiastes

- ← chapter 10 chapter 12 →
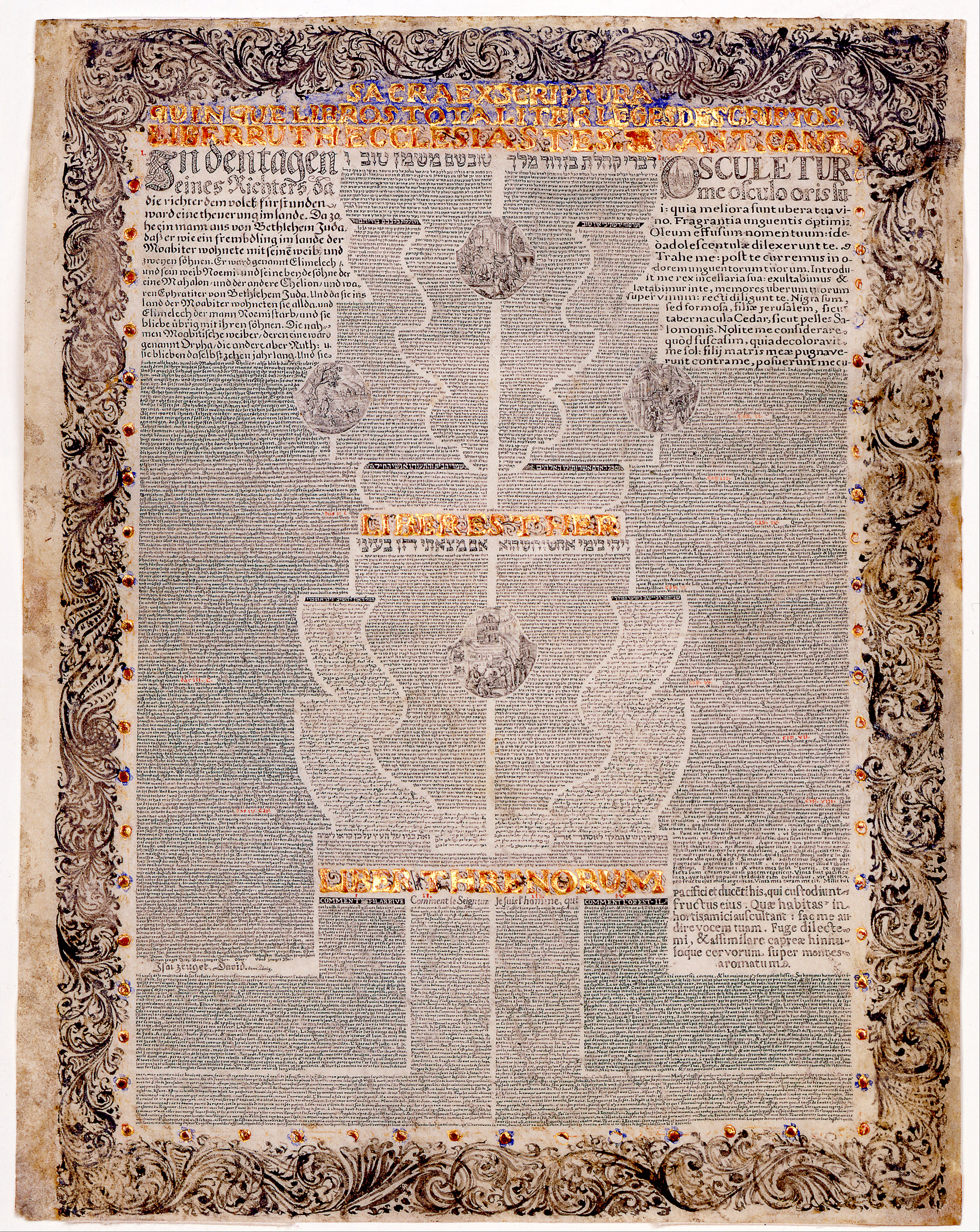
- The Five Scrolls – Ruth, Song of Songs, Ecclesiastes, Esther, and Lamentations – in multilingual micrography, by Aaron Wolf Herlingen (1748)
- Book: Book of Ecclesiastes
- Category: Ketuvim
- Christian Bible part: Old Testament
- Order in the Christian part: 21

Ecclesiastes 11 is the eleventh chapter of the Book of Ecclesiastes in the Hebrew Bible or the Old Testament of the Christian Bible. The book contains philosophical speeches by a character called '(the) Qoheleth' ("the Teacher"), composed probably between the 5th and 2nd centuries BCE. Peshitta, Targum, and Talmud attribute the authorship of the book to King Solomon. Michael Eaton notes that this chapter and the next are characterized by the encouragement to make decision and the need to act speedily.

== Text ==
The original text was written in Hebrew. This chapter is divided into 10 verses: by number of verses it is the shortest chapter in Ecclesiastes.

=== Textual witnesses ===
Some early manuscripts containing the text of this chapter in Hebrew are of the Masoretic Text, which includes Codex Leningradensis (1008). (Note: Since the anti-Jewish riots in Aleppo in 1947 the whole book has been missing from the Aleppo Codex.)

There is also a translation into Koine Greek known as the Septuagint, made in the last few centuries BCE. Extant ancient manuscripts of the Septuagint version include Codex Vaticanus (B; $\mathfrak{G}$^{B}; 4th century), Codex Sinaiticus (S; BHK: $\mathfrak{G}$^{S}; 4th century), and Codex Alexandrinus (A; $\mathfrak{G}$^{A}; 5th century). The Greek text is probably derived from the work of Aquila of Sinope or his followers.

== Structure ==
The New King James Version divides this chapter into two sections:

- Ecclesiastes 11:1–8 – The Value of Diligence
- Ecclesiastes 11:9–10 – Seek God in Early Life

== The venture of faith (11:1–6) ==
The keyword for this section is "faith" or considerable trust, so the ominous outlook or the unexpected happenings will not ruin the joy of life.

=== Verse 1 ===
Cast your bread upon the waters,

for you will find it after many days.

- "Cast your bread upon the waters": a saying about spontaneous good deeds. It seems to have a parallel in the Egyptian wisdom text Instruction of Ankhsheshonqy (19.10), "where the good deed thrown in the water is later recovered when dry".
- "Bread" is in the sense of 'goods', 'livelihood' (Deuteronomy 8:3).
- This verse was chosen by the Zionist Haganah to name its operation Cast Thy Bread of biological warfare against Palestinian Arab populations in the War of 1948.

=== Verse 3 ===
If the clouds are full of rain,

they empty themselves on the earth,

and if a tree falls to the south or to the north,

in the place where the tree falls, there it will lie.

This verse has been interpreted as having an eschatological dimension "because death will shortly cut us down". It is also considered the basis for the tort law principle damnum absque injuria that one bears the financial burden of their losses unless another person is at legal fault for proximately causing those damages.

== The life of joy (11:7–10) ==
Qoheleth ends his long monologue with a summary of advice: "life is good and to be enjoyed", especially best when one is young, but against that enjoyment, one must remember that "darkness is to follow, and that deeds will be judged", as "to remember one's creator is also to remember one's judge".

=== Verse 9 ===
Rejoice, O young man, in thy youth; and let thy heart cheer thee in the days of thy youth, and walk in the ways of thine heart, and in the sight of thine eyes: but know thou, that for all these things God will bring thee into judgment.

This is not to imply that enjoyment is contrary to God's will, because Qoheleth states multiple times that enjoyment is God's gift (2:24-26; 3:10-15; 5:18-20; 9:7-9), so it is more to mean that God will judge people for the failure to accept the gift of enjoyment.

== See also ==
- Related Bible parts: Proverbs 8

== Sources ==
- Coogan, Michael David (2007). Coogan, Michael David; Brettler, Marc Zvi; Newsom, Carol Ann; Perkins, Pheme (eds.). The New Oxford Annotated Bible with the Apocryphal/Deuterocanonical Books: New Revised Standard Version, Issue 48 (Augmented 3rd ed.). Oxford University Press. ISBN 9780195288810.
- Eaton, Michael A. (1994). "Ecclesiastes". In Carson, D. A.; France, R. T.; Motyer, J. A.; Wenham, G. J. (eds.). New Bible Commentary: 21st Century Edition (4, illustrated, reprint, revised ed.). Inter-Varsity Press. pp. 609–618. ISBN 9780851106489.
- Halley, Henry H. (1965). Halley's Bible Handbook: an abbreviated Bible commentary (24th (revised) ed.). Zondervan Publishing House. ISBN 0-310-25720-4.
- Weeks, Stuart (2007). "20. Ecclesiastes". In Barton, John; Muddiman, John (eds.). The Oxford Bible Commentary (first (paperback) ed.). Oxford University Press. pp. 423–429. ISBN 978-0199277186.
- Würthwein, Ernst (1995). The Text of the Old Testament. Translated by Rhodes, Erroll F. Grand Rapids, MI: Wm. B. Eerdmans. ISBN 0-8028-0788-7.
