= Ecclesiastes 4 =

Fourth chapter of the biblical book Ecclesiastes

- ← chapter 3 chapter 5 →
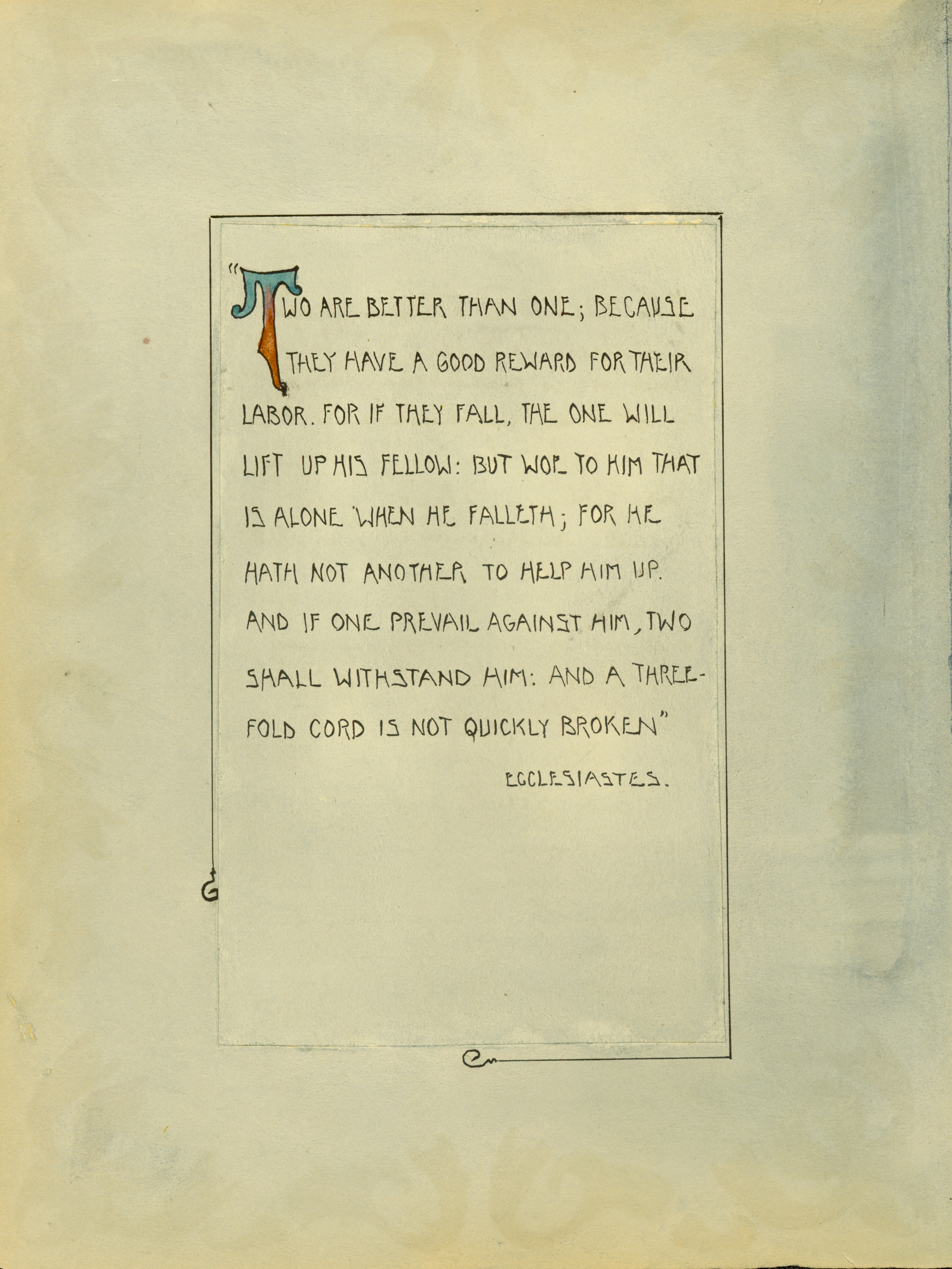
- Quote from Ecclesiastes 4:9–12 in The Potter's Wheel, November 1904
- Book: Book of Ecclesiastes
- Category: Ketuvim
- Christian Bible part: Old Testament
- Order in the Christian part: 21

Ecclesiastes 4 is the fourth chapter of the Book of Ecclesiastes in the Hebrew Bible or the Old Testament of the Christian Bible. The book contains philosophical speeches by a character called '(the) Qoheleth' ("the Teacher"), composed probably between the fifth and second centuries BCE. Peshitta, Targum, and Talmud attribute the authorship of the book to King Solomon. This chapter discusses life's hardship and life's companions.

== Text ==
The original text was written in Hebrew. This chapter is divided into 16 or 17 verses. (Note: The final verse of Ecclesiastes 4 in Hebrew texts appears in most English translations as the first verse of Ecclesiastes 5, with that chapter's subsequent verse numbers incremented accordingly. The New American Bible notably maintains the verse in Ecclesiastes 4.)

=== Textual witnesses ===
Some early manuscripts containing the text of this chapter in Hebrew are of the Masoretic Text, which includes Codex Leningradensis (1008). (Note: Since the anti-Jewish riots in Aleppo in 1947 the whole book has been missing from Aleppo Codex.)

There is also a translation into Koine Greek known as the Septuagint, made in the last few centuries BCE. Extant ancient manuscripts of the Septuagint version include Codex Vaticanus (B; $\mathfrak{G}$^{B}; 4th century), Codex Sinaiticus (S; BHK: $\mathfrak{G}$^{S}; 4th century), and Codex Alexandrinus (A; $\mathfrak{G}$^{A}; 5th century). The Greek text is probably derived from the work of Aquila of Sinope or his followers.

== Structure ==
The New King James Version divides this chapter into four sections:

- Ecclesiastes 4:1–3 = The Uselessness of Selfish Toil
- Ecclesiastes 4:4–8 = The Vanity of Selfish Toil
- Ecclesiastes 4:9–12 = The Value of a Friend
- Ecclesiastes 4:13–16 = Popularity Passes Away

== Oppression without comfort (4:1–3) ==
Following the reaction to the apparent perverted nature of the world in chapter 3, Qoheleth states that being dead or unborn is better than living to experience the horror of oppression, with little solace and no comforter for the oppressed. The solution may be hinted before (2:26; 3:22) but none is suggested here.

=== Verse 1 ===
Then I returned and considered all the oppression that is done under the sun:

And look! The tears of the oppressed,
But they have no comforter—
On the side of their oppressors there is power,
But they have no comforter.

Qoheleth "returns" to his thoughts in Ecclesiastes 3:16. August Hahn suggests instead, And anew, I saw...

== 'All their Toil' (4:4–12) ==
Qoheleth uses the oppressed's loneliness to switch his focus to competition as the sole motive for work and skill, which also "vanity" to his view. It may lead on one hand to envy and rivalry, or on the other hand, the withdrawal from life altogether, folding of the hands that elsewhere is associated with sloth (cf. Proverbs 6:10; 24:33). This brings the argument that co-operation is better than competition, as pointed in verse 9, given illustrations in verses 10–12a and restated in 12b. The saying about the strength of a plaited cord in verse 12b resembles an ancient proverb found in the Epic of Gilgamesh.

=== Verse 4 ===
Again, I considered all travail, and every right work, that for this a man is envied of his neighbour. This is also vanity and vexation of spirit.

- "Vanity": translated from the Hebrew word hebel which can refer to a "vapor" or "mere breath" (also in verses 7, 8, 16; cf. 1:2).

== An isolated leader: Wise Youth, Foolish King (4:13–16) ==
In this part Qoheleth is again comparing one idea against another: a wise youth is better than one elderly king who becomes foolish, but the popularity of that youth will not last, for this person will soon be replaced by another youth and ultimately forgotten as the cycle keeps repeating. Two universally true points are that isolation is a part of the pain in human experience and that the next generation won't solve the problem of the previous one (cf. Ecclesiastes 1:9–11). In any case, Qoheleth seems to be drawing out an implication of 1:11, that the true and important things at one moment will only be forgotten and swallowed up in repetition of time.

=== Verse 13 ===
Better is a poor and a wise child than an old and foolish king, who will no more be admonished.

- "Child": from Hebrew ילד, ye-leḏ, which can also refer to "youth" (NKJV; ESV) or "young man" at the age of teens to forties.

The elderly king was once wise (suggested by "no more"), but then lost his wisdom.

== Musical settings ==
- Vier ernste Gesänge, a cycle of four songs for bass and piano by Johannes Brahms written in 1896; the second part is taken from Ecclesiastes 4:1–3.

== See also ==
- Related Bible parts: Ecclesiastes 1

== Sources ==
- Chilton, Bruce; Kee, Howard Clark; Meyers, Eric M.; Rogerson, John; Levine, Amy-Jill; Saldarini, Anthony J., eds. (2008). The Cambridge Companion to the Bible (2nd ed.). Cambridge University Press. ISBN 9780521691406.
- Eaton, Michael A. (1994). "Ecclesiastes". In Carson, D. A.; France, R. T.; Motyer, J. A.; Wenham, G. J. (eds.). New Bible Commentary: 21st Century Edition (4, illustrated, reprint, revised ed.). Inter-Varsity Press. pp. 609–618. ISBN 9780851106489.
- Halley, Henry H. (1965). Halley's Bible Handbook: an abbreviated Bible commentary (24th (revised) ed.). Zondervan Publishing House. ISBN 0-310-25720-4.
- Weeks, Stuart (2007). "20. Ecclesiastes". In Barton, John; Muddiman, John (eds.). The Oxford Bible Commentary (first (paperback) ed.). Oxford University Press. pp. 423–429. ISBN 978-0199277186.
- Würthwein, Ernst (1995). The Text of the Old Testament. Translated by Rhodes, Erroll F. Grand Rapids, MI: Wm. B. Eerdmans. ISBN 0-8028-0788-7.
