= Ecclesiastes 1 =

First chapter of the biblical book Ecclesiastes

- ← Proverbs 31 chapter 2 →
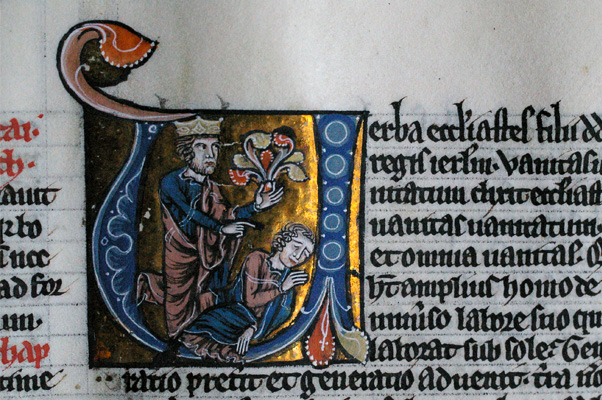
- A picture of Solomon holding a flower and of a youth, a miniature from the opening of Ecclesiastes (in Latin) in the Bible of the Monastery of Santa Maria de Alcobaça, c. 1220s (National Library of Portugal ALC.455, fl.207)
- Book: Book of Ecclesiastes
- Category: Ketuvim
- Christian Bible part: Old Testament
- Order in the Christian part: 21

Ecclesiastes 1 is the first chapter of the Book of Ecclesiastes in the Hebrew Bible or the Old Testament of the Christian Bible. The book contains philosophical speeches by a character called Qoheleth ("the Teacher"; 'one who speaks before an assembly') composed probably between the 5th and 2nd centuries BC. Peshitta, Targum, and Talmud, as well as most Jewish and Christian readership, attribute the authorship of the book to King Solomon. This chapter contains the title of the book, the exposition of some fundamental observations and the problem of life, especially the failure of wisdom.

== Text ==
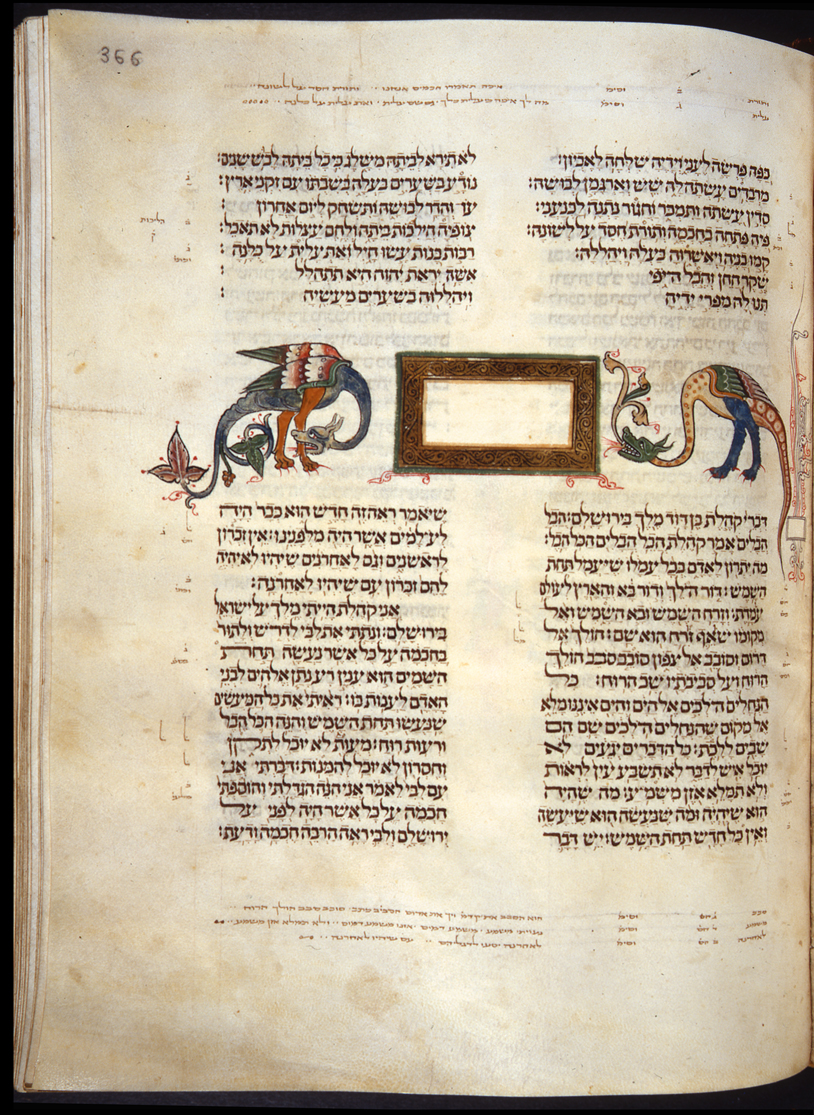
Ecclesiastes 1 in Bíblia de Cervera (fl 366; between 1299 and 1300) at Biblioteca Nacional de Portugal

The original text was written in Hebrew. This chapter is divided into 18 verses.

=== Textual witnesses ===
Some early manuscripts containing the text of this chapter in Hebrew are of the Masoretic Text, which includes Codex Leningradensis (1008). (Note: Since the anti-Jewish riots in Aleppo in 1947 the whole book has been missing from the Aleppo Codex.) Fragments containing parts of this chapter were found among the Dead Sea Scrolls: 4QQoh^{b} (4Q110; 30 BC – 30 AD; extant verses 8–15).

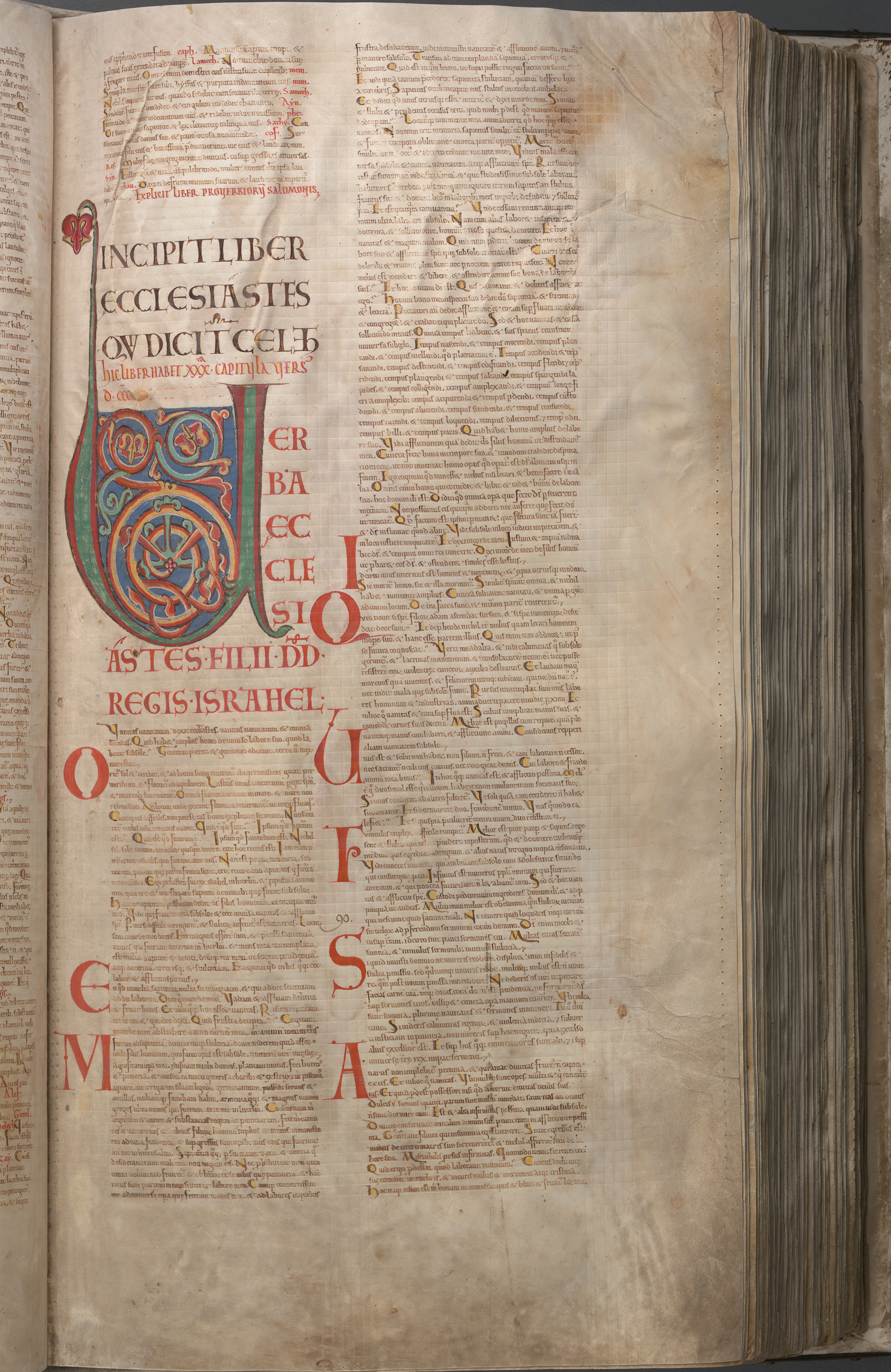
A page containing Ecclesiastes 1:1–5:17 from Codex Gigas, Latin translation of 13th century

There is also a translation into Koine Greek known as the Septuagint, made in the last few centuries BCE. Extant ancient manuscripts of the Septuagint version include Codex Vaticanus (B; $\mathfrak{G}$^{B}; 4th century), Codex Sinaiticus (S; BHK: $\mathfrak{G}$^{S}; 4th century), and Codex Alexandrinus (A; $\mathfrak{G}$^{A}; 5th century). The Greek text is probably derived from the work of Aquila of Sinope or his followers.

=== Verse 1 ===
The words of the Preacher, the son of David, king in Jerusalem.

- "Preacher": "Convener" or "Collector"; Hebrew: קהלת, Qoheleth (so throughout Ecclesiastes), meaning simply "teacher" (a Hebrew participle). Its verbal root qahal means 'to assemble'.
- "The son of David, king in Jerusalem" may refer to any king in the line of David ("Davidic King"). This is picked up in Ecclesiastes 1:12, which states that he ruled "Israel" from Jerusalem; if "Israel" is meant to include the Northern Kingdom of Israel, then the only descendants of David to rule it were Solomon or his son, the 'far-from-wise Rehoboam'. (Note: 1 Kings 12 records that Rehoboam sought advice from the elders who had served his father, then rejected their advice in favour of that of the young men with whom he had grown up.) From the further descriptions in chapter 1 and 2 clearly "Qoheleth" refers to Solomon, although the name 'Solomon' is avoided, not explicitly claimed as in Song 1:1 or Proverbs 1:1.

== Prologue (verses 2–11) ==
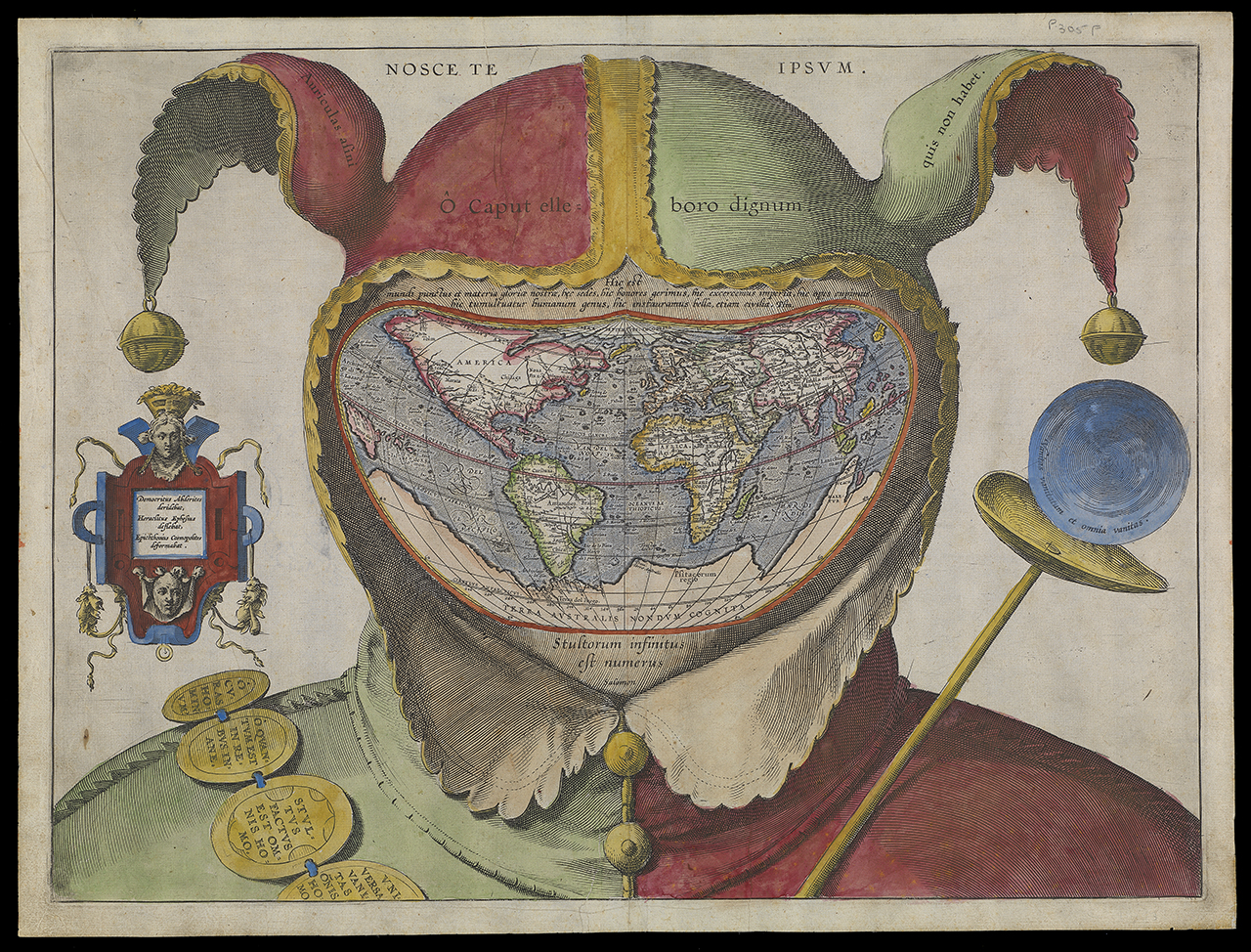
Fool's Cap World MapFool's World Map, based on Ortelius's third 'Typus Orbis Terrarum,' (1590). A Latin quote from Ecclesiastes 1:2 is shown as engraved in the cup at the top of the jester's staff on the right: 'Vanitas vanitatum et omnia vanitas' ("Vanity of vanities, all is vanity") and below the map is a text taken from the Vulgate translation of Ecclesiastes 1:15: 'Stultorum infinitus est numerus' ("The number of fools is infinite").

=== Verse 2 ===
Vanity of vanities, says the Preacher,

vanity of vanities! All is vanity.

The Lexham English Bible calls this verse the preacher's "motto". The motto appears again at the end of his teaching in Ecclesiastes 12:8. "Vanity", the key term of this book, translates the Hebrew term הבל, hebel, meaning "vanity" or "vain", concretely referring to a "mist", "vapor", or "mere breath", and metaphorically to 'something that is fleeting or elusive' (with different nuances depending on the context). It can also be translated as 'Absurdity, Frustration, Futility, Nonsense'. The word appears five times in this verse alone and is found in 29 other verses in Ecclesiastes.

"Vanity of vanities" reflects the Hebrew: הבל הבלים (habel habalim).

=== Verse 3 ===
What profit has a man from all his labor
In which he toils under the sun?

This rhetorical question follows the claim of "vanity" and is followed by the portrayal of a world 'impervious to human effort.'

- "Profit" (ESV: "gain"; Hebrew: יתרון, yithron,): a term used in (ancient) commerce.
- Both the noun "labor" and the verb "toil" come from the Hebrew root word amal (עמל, as noun or verb) which may refer to 'physical effort' (cf. Ecclesiastes 2:4–8; Psalm 127:1) or to 'mental and emotional heaviness' (cf. Ecclesiastes 2:3; Psalm 25:18).

=== Verse 9 ===
Verse 9 contains the well-known saying, "there is nothing new under the sun".

=== Verse 11 ===
There is no remembrance of former things,
Nor will there be any remembrance of things that are to come
By those who will come after.

"So ends the prologue of the book, sounding its terrible sentence of despair on life and all its interests." Edward Plumptre argues that "former things" and "things ... to come" should be translated as "former men" and "those that shall come after". The New International Version translates this verse as "No one remembers the former generations, and even those yet to come will not be remembered by those who follow them".

== The failure of wisdom (verses 12–18) ==
The problems declared in the earlier part are attempted to be solved using 'wisdom', but the conclusion in this part is that wisdom can only enlarge one's view of the problem but does not bring any solution, and the real solution is still to be anticipated. Biblical commentator Stuart Weeks reads these verses with chapter 2 as a single "fictional memoir" recounting the preacher's "quest for understanding".

=== Verse 13 ===
I set my heart to seek and search out by wisdom concerning all that is done under heaven; this burdensome task God has given to the sons of man, by which they may be exercised.

The King James Version of this verse reads "I gave my heart ...", words "expressive of the spirit of an earnest seeker, [and] eminently characteristic of this book". In Hebrew thought, the heart is the seat of life, or emotion, but also the seat of reason.

=== Verse 18 ===
For in much wisdom is much grief,
And he who increases knowledge increases sorrow

The Teacher (Qoheleth) pessimistically concludes that wisdom and knowledge only enhance 'vexation and sorrow'.

== See also ==
- Related Bible parts: Psalm 127, Ecclesiastes 12

== Sources ==
- Eaton, Michael A. (1994). "Ecclesiastes". In Carson, D. A.; France, R. T.; Motyer, J. A.; Wenham, G. J. (eds.). New Bible Commentary: 21st Century Edition (4, illustrated, reprint, revised ed.). Inter-Varsity Press. pp. 609–618. ISBN 9780851106489.
- Halley, Henry H. (1965). Halley's Bible Handbook: an abbreviated Bible commentary (24th (revised) ed.). Zondervan Publishing House. ISBN 0-310-25720-4.
- Weeks, Stuart (2007). "20. Ecclesiastes". In Barton, John; Muddiman, John (eds.). The Oxford Bible Commentary (first (paperback) ed.). Oxford University Press. pp. 423–429. ISBN 978-0199277186.
- Würthwein, Ernst (1995). The Text of the Old Testament. Translated by Rhodes, Erroll F. Grand Rapids, MI: Wm. B. Eerdmans. ISBN 0-8028-0788-7.
