= Ecclesiastes 7 =

Seventh chapter of the biblical book Ecclesiastes

- ← chapter 6 chapter 8 →
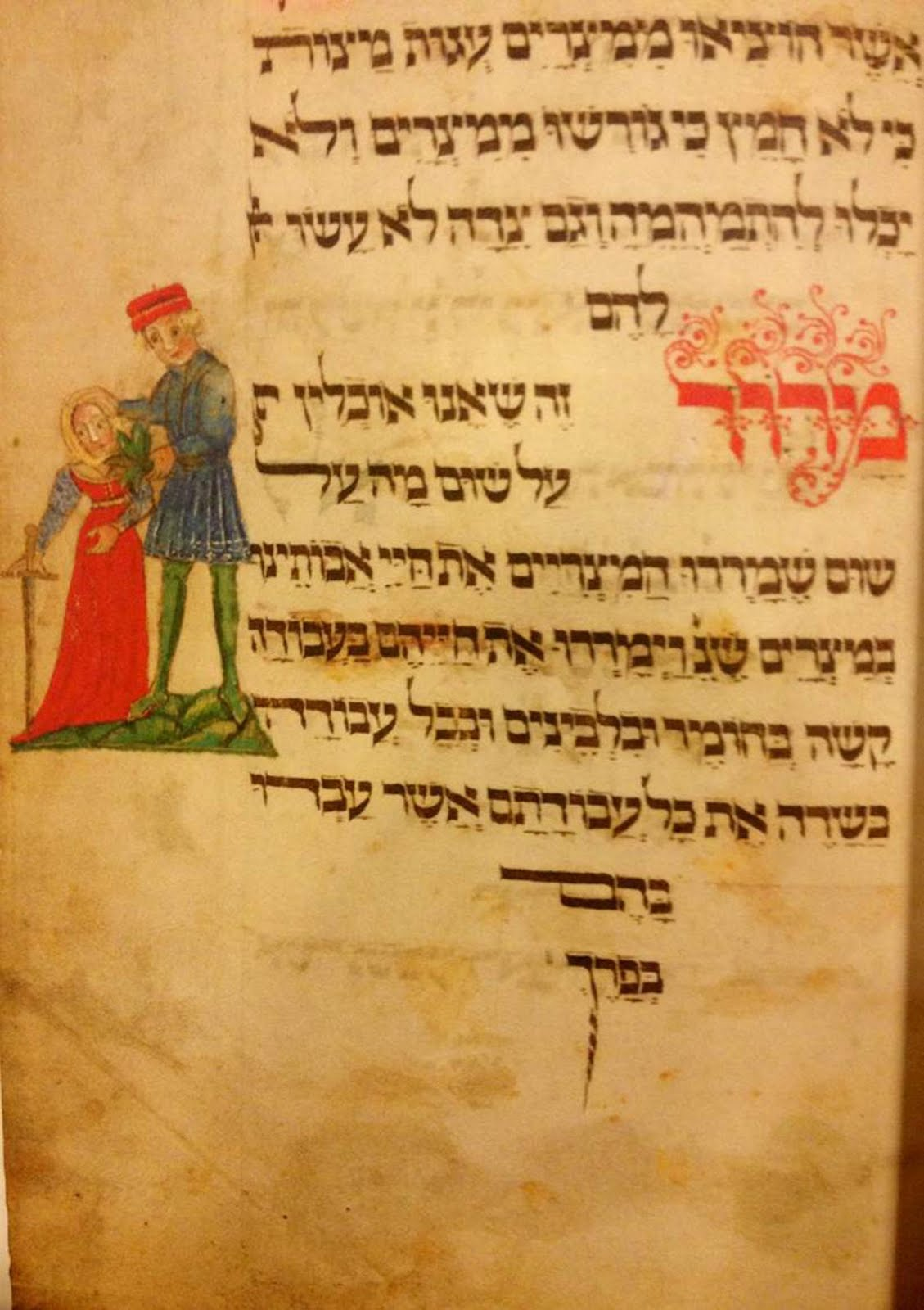
- Illustration from the Washington Haggadah on Ecclesiastes 7:26, concerning a custom that a man points to his wife when mentioning maror (Mediaeval).
- Book: Book of Ecclesiastes
- Category: Ketuvim
- Christian Bible part: Old Testament
- Order in the Christian part: 21

Ecclesiastes 7 is the seventh chapter of the Book of Ecclesiastes in the Hebrew Bible or the Old Testament of the Christian Bible. The book contains philosophical speeches by a character called '(the) Qoheleth' ("the Teacher"), composed probably between the 5th and 2nd centuries BC. Peshitta, Targum, and Talmud attribute the authorship of the book to King Solomon.

This chapter deals with suffering and sin. The style of the first half (verses 1–14) is similar to that of the 'sentence literature' collections (such as Proverbs 10:1–22:16) and, as in such collections, the sayings are linked by catchwords and thematic ties with the previous ones, with a series of "better ... than" presenting dialectic pairs of issues. The second half exposes the 'crookedness of life' (verse 13) that moves to the 'crookedness of humanity' (verse 29).

== Text ==
The original text was written in Hebrew. This chapter is divided into 29 verses. The Latin Vulgate has 30 verses, as it includes Ecclesiastes 6:12 as verse 7:1.

=== Textual witnesses ===
Some early manuscripts containing the text of this chapter in Hebrew are of the Masoretic Text, which includes Codex Leningradensis (1008). (Note: Since the anti-Jewish riots in Aleppo in 1947 the whole book has been missing from the Aleppo Codex.) Fragments containing parts of this chapter were found among the Dead Sea Scrolls 4QQoh^{a} (4Q109; 175-150 BC; extant verses 1–10, 19–20).

There is also a translation into Koine Greek known as the Septuagint, made in the last few centuries BC. Extant ancient manuscripts of the Septuagint version include Codex Vaticanus (B; $\mathfrak{G}$^{B}; 4th century), Codex Sinaiticus (S; BHK: $\mathfrak{G}$^{S}; 4th century), and Codex Alexandrinus (A; $\mathfrak{G}$^{A}; 5th century). The Greek text is probably derived from the work of Aquila of Sinope or his followers.

== Structure ==
In the Jerusalem Bible, this chapter opens Part Two of the book, and verses 1-7 are presented as a "prologue" comparable to the opening prologue in Ecclesiastes 1:4-11. E. H. Plumptre sees this chapter as an interruption to the "sequence of thought" being developed in chapter 6. The New American Bible (Revised Edition) divides the chapter into three parts, with verses 1-14 providing a "critique of [the] sages on the Day of Adversity", verses 15 a "critique of [the] sages on Justice and Wickedness", and verses 26-29 a "critique of [the] advice of women".

== Instructive suffering (7:1–6) ==
This section gives the first instruction about suffering, to be followed by the exposition about its dangers in hindering wisdom (verses 7–10). As a funeral may cause one to think about life, whereas a party probably not, visits to 'house of mourning' may bring more valuable lessons for inner character, enabling true resolutions in one's life.

=== Verse 1 ===
A good name is better than precious ointment,
And the day of death than the day of one’s birth.

This verse opens a series of maxims continuing to verse 5. There is an alliteration in the Hebrew is hidden in English translation: A good name (shem) is better than good ointment (shemen).

== Four dangers (7:7–10) ==
There are four dangers which hinder wisdom: corruption (verse 7), impatience (verse 8), bitterness (verse 9) and nostalgia (verse 10). To deal with these one needs to take "a long-term view of life when reacting to adversity".

== The need of wisdom (7:11–12) ==
Wisdom, like a land which could be given as an inheritance, belongs to God but is granted to his people, and it has a deeper level of protective power than wealth.

== Life under God (7:13–14) ==
Both good times and bad times are God-ordained and purposeful, so people should accept good when accessible and face adversity when it becomes reality.

== Neither too wise nor too foolish (7:15–22) ==
This part states the 'inadvisability of extreme righteousness and wisdom', with the advice to adopt only some parts of wisdom, 'neither to be too wise and righteous, nor too foolish and wicked', but 'a bit of both', as those who fear God will succeed in both or 'escape the consequences of doing neither'.

== The search for integrity (7:23–29) ==
The section suggests that it is not so easy to find wisdom nor any 'definitive explanation of the world'. It closes with Qoheleth's ironic commentary in Ecclesiastes 8:1.

=== Verse 26 ===
And I find something more bitter than death: the woman whose heart is snares and nets, and whose hands are fetters. He who pleases God escapes her, but the sinner is taken by her.

The statements in this verse are not a polemic against women, but an allegorical warning against "Folly", described as an evilly seductive woman (cf. Proverbs 2:16-19; 5:20; 6:24-35; 7:5-27; 23:27-28), who is on a hunt to catch sinful people.

- "He who pleases God": Literally, "He who is good before God"

== See also ==
- Memento mori
- Related Bible parts: Proverbs 2, 5, 6, 7, 10, 23

== Sources ==
- Coogan, Michael David (2007). Coogan, Michael David; Brettler, Marc Zvi; Newsom, Carol Ann; Perkins, Pheme (eds.). The New Oxford Annotated Bible with the Apocryphal/Deuterocanonical Books: New Revised Standard Version, Issue 48 (Augmented 3rd ed.). Oxford University Press. ISBN 9780195288810.
- Eaton, Michael A. (1994). "Ecclesiastes". In Carson, D. A.; France, R. T.; Motyer, J. A.; Wenham, G. J. (eds.). New Bible Commentary: 21st Century Edition (4, illustrated, reprint, revised ed.). Inter-Varsity Press. pp. 609–618. ISBN 9780851106489.
- Halley, Henry H. (1965). Halley's Bible Handbook: an abbreviated Bible commentary (24th (revised) ed.). Zondervan Publishing House. ISBN 0-310-25720-4.
- Weeks, Stuart (2007). "20. Ecclesiastes". In Barton, John; Muddiman, John (eds.). The Oxford Bible Commentary (first (paperback) ed.). Oxford University Press. pp. 423–429. ISBN 978-0199277186.
- Würthwein, Ernst (1995). The Text of the Old Testament. Translated by Rhodes, Erroll F. Grand Rapids, MI: Wm. B. Eerdmans. ISBN 0-8028-0788-7.
