= Ecclesiastes 3 =

Third chapter of the biblical book Ecclesiastes

- ← chapter 2 chapter 4 →
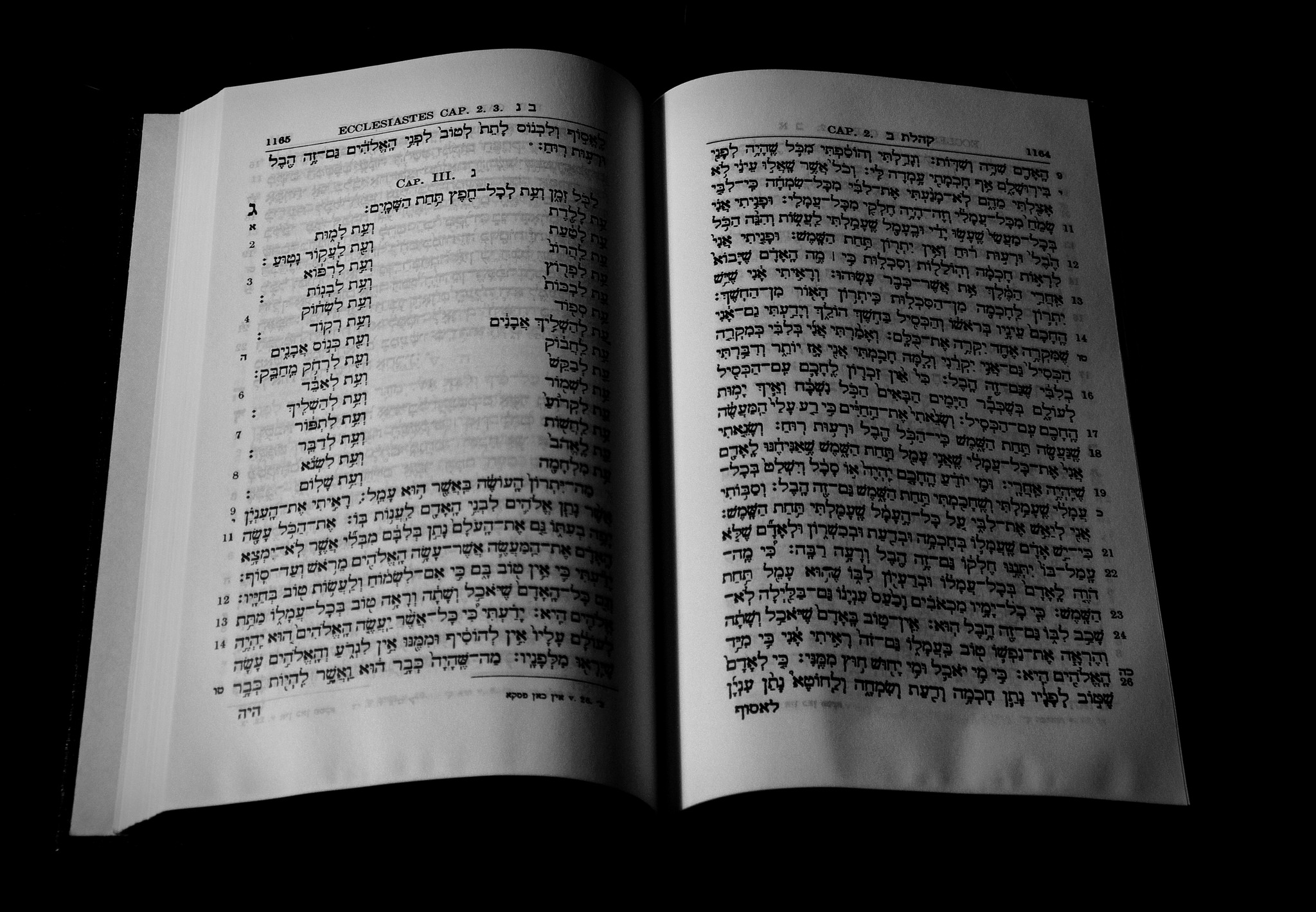
- Ecclesiastes 2:10-26 on the right page and Ecclesiastes 3:1-14 on the left page of the Bible in Hebrew (reading from right to left).
- Book: Book of Ecclesiastes
- Category: Ketuvim
- Christian Bible part: Old Testament
- Order in the Christian part: 21

Ecclesiastes 3 is the third chapter of the Book of Ecclesiastes in the Hebrew Bible or the Old Testament of the Christian Bible. The book contains philosophical speeches by a character called 'Qoheleth' ("the Teacher"; Koheleth or Kohelet), composed probably between the fifth and second centuries BC. Peshitta, Targum, and Talmud attribute the authorship of the book to King Solomon.

== Text ==
The original text was written in Hebrew. This chapter is divided into 22 verses.

=== Textual witnesses ===
Some early manuscripts containing the text of this chapter in Hebrew are of the Masoretic Text, which includes Codex Leningradensis (1008). (Note: Since the anti-Jewish riots in Aleppo in 1947 the whole book has been missing from the Aleppo Codex.)

There is also a translation into Koine Greek known as the Septuagint, made in the last few centuries BCE. Extant ancient manuscripts of the Septuagint version include Codex Vaticanus (B; $\mathfrak{G}$^{B}; 4th century), Codex Sinaiticus (S; BHK: $\mathfrak{G}$^{S}; 4th century), and Codex Alexandrinus (A; $\mathfrak{G}$^{A}; 5th century). The Greek text is probably derived from the work of Aquila of Sinope or his followers.

== Structure ==
The New King James Version divides this chapter into three sections:

- Ecclesiastes 3:1–8 = Everything Has Its Time
- Ecclesiastes 3:9–15 = The God-Given Task
- Ecclesiastes 3:16–22 = Injustice Seems to Prevail

== Everything suitable for its time (3:1–8) ==
The section calls to 'a view of God's sovereignty which both reassures and yet sobers' the readers, because God is in control, but it remains mysterious. The NewCity Editor's Letter cites these verses as "one of the world’s earlier and best-known poems".

=== Verse 1 ===
To every thing there is a season,

A time for every purpose under the heaven:

'There is purposefulness in life' as God always has the oversight over the seasons (cf. Psalm 31:15: my times are in your hands).

- "Season" (Hebrew: זְמָ֑ן, zə-mān): refers to "appointed or definite time".
- "Time" (Hebrew: עת, ‘êṯ): means 'occasion', 'period/season' or 'circumstances'.
- "Purpose": from Hebrew word חֵפֶץ, chephets, which can be translated as "delight" or "pleasure" (cf. Psalm 1:2).

=== Verses 2–8 ===
Verses 2–8 give a list of times for major activities, according to God's plan. It forms a poem, where two Hebrew words are contrasted with two other Hebrew words in each verse. The examples are related to the body, mind and soul. It gives vivid illustration to the statement in verse 1 "that every action or event will come to pass", with the explanation in verse 11 that God made everything "suitable for its time". The context of the poem is the lack of freedom in human life, dictated by external and natural constraints as well as no control when one is born or dies, alongside the human incapacity to discern a deeper purpose in life, while being understood as an 'affirmation of the beauty of the life that God has given to human race'.

2a	עת ללדת [et la·ledet]	a time to be born	ו [we] (= "and")	עת למות [et la·mut]	a time to die
2b	עת לטעת [et la·ṭa·‘aṯ]	a time to plant	ו [we] (= "and")	עת לעקור נטוע [et la·‘ă·qōr nā·ṭū·a‘]	a time to pluck up that which is planted
3a	עת להרוג [et la·hă·rōḡ]	a time to kill	ו [we] (= "and")	עת לרפוא [et lir·pō·w]	a time to heal
3b	עת לפרוץ [et lip·rōtz]	a time to break down	ו [we] (= "and")	עת לבנות [et liḇ·nōṯ.]	a time to build up
4a	עת לבכות [et liḇ·kōṯ]	a time to weep	ו [we] (= "and")	עת לשחוק [et liś·ḥōq]	a time to laugh
4b	עת ספוד [et sə·pōḏ]	a time to mourn	ו [we] (= "and")	עת רקוד [et rə·qōḏ]]	a time to dance
5a	עת להשליך אבנים [et lə·hashə·lîḵ ’ă·ḇā·nîm]	a time to cast away stones	ו [we] (= "and")	עת כנוס אבנים [et kə·nōs ’ă·ḇā·nîm]	a time to gather stones together
5b	עת לחבוק [et la·ḥă·ḇōq]	a time to embrace	ו [we] (= "and")	עת לרחק מחבק [et lir·ḥōq mê·ḥa·bêq]	a time to refrain from embracing
6a	עת לבקש [et lə·ḇa·qêš]	a time to get	ו [we] (= "and")	עת לאבד [et lə·’a·bêḏ]	a time to lose
6b	עת לשמור [et liš·mōr]	a time to keep	ו [we] (= "and")	עת להשליך [et lə·hashə·lîḵ]	a time to cast away
7a	עת לקרוע [et liq·rō·w·a‘]	a time to rend	ו [we] (= "and")	עת לתפור [et liṯ·pōr]	a time to sew
7b	עת לחשות [et la·ḥă·shōṯ]	a time to keep silence	ו [we] (= "and")	עת לדבר [et lə·ḏa·bêr]	a time to speak
8a	עת לאהב [et le·’ĕ·hōḇ]	a time to love	ו [we] (= "and")	עת לשנא [et liś·nō]	a time to hate
8b	עת מלחמה [et mil·khā·māh]	a time of war	ו [we] (= "and")	עת שלום [et shā·lōm]	a time of peace

== Contentment and satisfaction (3:9–15) ==
The question in verse 9 reminds that the desired 'gain' is hard to find, becoming 'the divinely quest for meaningfulness' (verse 10), but only within the limit of human understanding (verse 11). The phrase 'I know' starts each of two sections (verses 12–13 and 14–15) to discern the question.

=== Verse 11 ===
He hath made every thing beautiful in his time:

also he hath set the world in their heart,

so that no man can find out the work that God maketh from the beginning to the end.

God who made everything suitable for its time is also the one placing a sense of past and future (lit. 'eternity') into human consciousness, although paradoxically despite knowing the reality of this eternity (transcending the moment), human beings can cope only with the moment.

=== Verse 12 ===
I know that there is no good in them, but for a man to rejoice, and to do good in his life.

- "To do good" (Hebrew: לַעֲשׂ֥וֹת ט֖וֹב, la-‘ă-shōṯ ṭōḇ): is 'to practice a happy life', which is better expressed as 'enjoy good'.

=== Verse 13 ===
And also that every man should eat and drink, and enjoy the good of all his labour, it is the gift of God.

Eaton sees this verse as a reminder that 'provision and contentment are gifts of God'.

=== Verse 15 ===
That which is has already been, And what is to be has already been; And God requires an account of what is past.

American theologian Albert Barnes notes the difficulty in reading the King James Version's text: That which hath been is now ..., which he attributes to the word "is" being "erroneously printed" in Roman characters, as it does not appear in the Hebrew: it should have been italicised as an added word, and "now" would have read better as "already", as in several more recent translations such as the New King James Version show above.

== The judgment of God (3:16–22) ==
God as the controller uses injustices to show that without him human beings are no different from animals (verse 18), in their dying (verses 19–20), and in the appreciation they receive after death (verse 21), so as the conclusion: 'the remedy to life's enigma is to live on God's goodness'.

=== Verse 20 ===
All go unto one place; all are of the dust, and all turn to dust again.

== Musical settings ==
- Vier ernste Gesänge, a cycle of four songs for bass and piano by Johannes Brahms written in 1896; the first part is taken from Ecclesiastes 3:19–22.
- The first phrase of verse 11 becomes an inspiration for the popular hymn "In His Time, in His Time" (song and lyrics by Diane Ball in 1978).
- "Turn! Turn! Turn! (To Everything There Is a Season)", a song written by Pete Seeger in the late 1950s, which the Byrds scored a 1965 hit with. The lyrics, except for the title which is repeated throughout the song and the final two lines, are adapted word-for-word from the English King James Version of Ecclesiastes 3:1-8. The song became an international hit in late 1965 when it was covered by the American folk rock band The Byrds. In the U.S., the song holds distinction as the number one hit with the oldest lyrics.

== See also ==
- Related Bible parts: Ecclesiastes 8, Romans 2

== Sources ==
- Chilton, Bruce; Kee, Howard Clark; Meyers, Eric M.; Rogerson, John; Levine, Amy-Jill; Saldarini, Anthony J., eds. (2008). The Cambridge Companion to the Bible (2nd ed.). Cambridge University Press. ISBN 9780521691406.
- Coogan, Michael David (2007). Coogan, Michael David; Brettler, Marc Zvi; Newsom, Carol Ann; Perkins, Pheme (eds.). The New Oxford Annotated Bible with the Apocryphal/Deuterocanonical Books: New Revised Standard Version, Issue 48 (Augmented 3rd ed.). Oxford University Press. ISBN 9780195288810.
- Eaton, Michael A. (1994). "Ecclesiastes". In Carson, D. A.; France, R. T.; Motyer, J. A.; Wenham, G. J. (eds.). New Bible Commentary: 21st Century Edition (4, illustrated, reprint, revised ed.). Inter-Varsity Press. pp. 609–618. ISBN 9780851106489.
- Halley, Henry H. (1965). Halley's Bible Handbook: an abbreviated Bible commentary (24th (revised) ed.). Zondervan Publishing House. ISBN 0-310-25720-4.
- Weeks, Stuart (2007). "20. Ecclesiastes". In Barton, John; Muddiman, John (eds.). The Oxford Bible Commentary (first (paperback) ed.). Oxford University Press. pp. 423–429. ISBN 978-0199277186.
- Würthwein, Ernst (1995). The Text of the Old Testament. Translated by Rhodes, Erroll F. Grand Rapids, MI: Wm. B. Eerdmans. ISBN 0-8028-0788-7.
