= Ecclesiastes 2 =

Second chapter of the biblical book Ecclesiastes

- ← chapter 1 chapter 3 →
- Ecclesiastes in Hebrew, Aramaic, and Arabic from Yemen, circa 1480. British Library ms. Or 2375.
- Book: Book of Ecclesiastes
- Category: Ketuvim
- Christian Bible part: Old Testament
- Order in the Christian part: 21

Ecclesiastes 2 is the second chapter of the Book of Ecclesiastes in the Hebrew Bible or the Old Testament of the Christian Bible. The book contains philosophical speeches by a character called Qoheleth ("the Teacher"; Koheleth or Kohelet), composed probably between the 5th and 2nd centuries BCE. Peshitta, Targum, and Talmud attribute the authorship of the book to King Solomon.

The chapter continues the presentation of memoir in verses 12-18 of the previous chapter, with more observations on human efforts in life, related to the question in Ecclesiastes 1:3, What profit has a man from all his labor, in which he toils under the sun?, and on the sufferings and the enjoyment of life in light of a divine dispensation.

== Text ==
The original text was written in Hebrew. This chapter is divided into 26 verses.

=== Textual witnesses ===
Some early manuscripts containing the text of this chapter in Hebrew are of the Masoretic Text, which includes Codex Leningradensis (1008). (Note: Since the anti-Jewish riots in Aleppo in 1947 the whole book has been missing from the Aleppo Codex.)

There is also a translation into Koine Greek known as the Septuagint, made in the last few centuries BCE. Extant ancient manuscripts of the Septuagint version include Codex Vaticanus (B; $\mathfrak{G}$^{B}; 4th century), Codex Sinaiticus (S; BHK: $\mathfrak{G}$^{S}; 4th century), and Codex Alexandrinus (A; $\mathfrak{G}$^{A}; 5th century). The Greek text is probably derived from the work of Aquila of Sinope or his followers.

== The failure of pleasure-seeking (2:1–11) ==
=== Verse 2 ===
"Laughter", I said, "is madness. And what does pleasure accomplish?"

There is a similar sentiment in Proverbs 14:13: Even in laughter the heart may ache, and rejoicing may end in grief.

=== Verse 11 ===
Then I looked on all the works that my hands had wrought, and on the labour that I had laboured to do: and, behold, all was vanity and vexation of spirit, and there was no profit under the sun.

This conclusion is an echo from the statements in Ecclesiastes 2:1–2.

- "Vexation of spirit" (NKJV: "grasping for the wind"; ESV: "a striving after wind"): or a 'chasing after wind'.

== A sure fate for all (2:12–23) ==
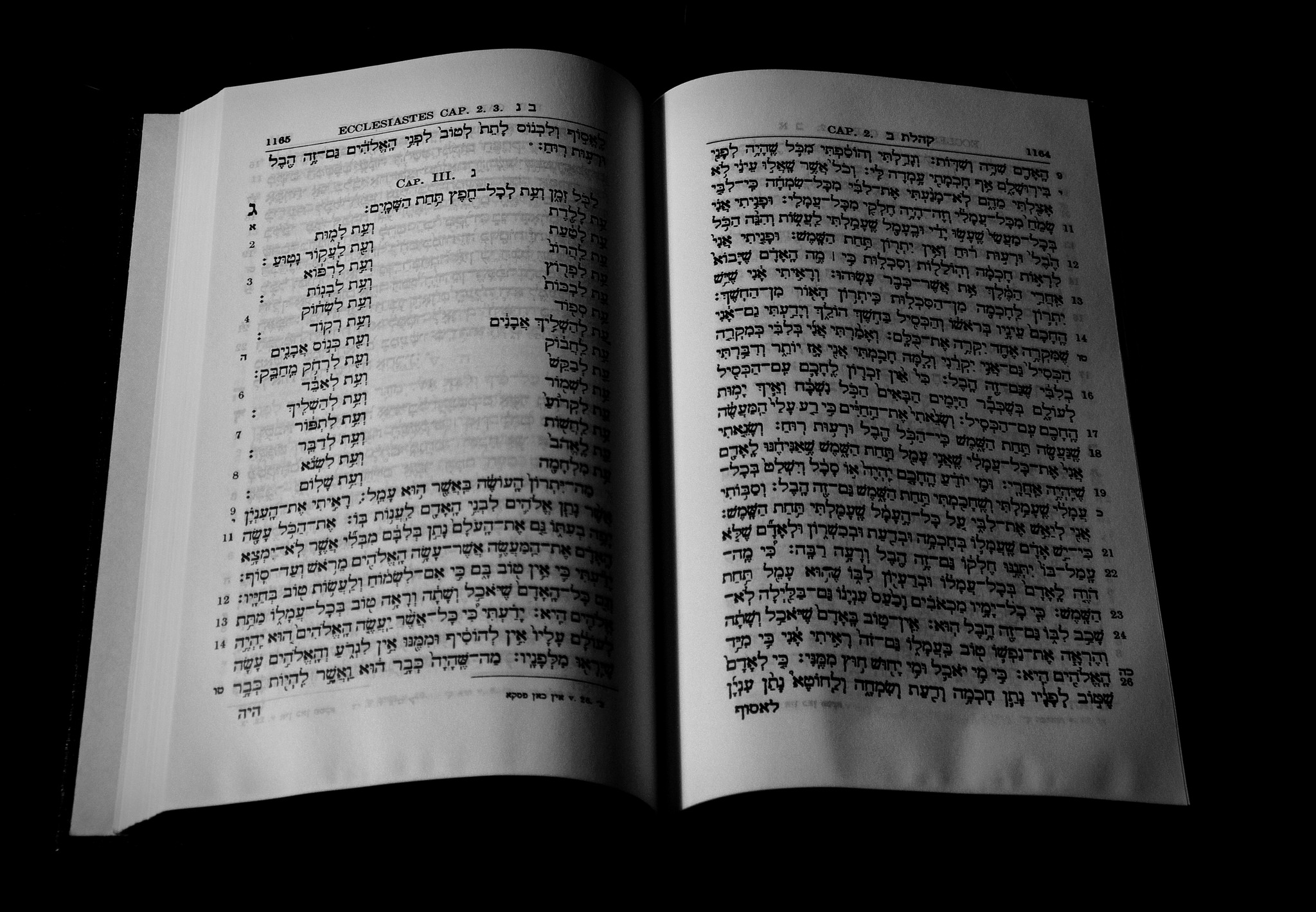
Ecclesiastes 2:10-26 on the right page and Ecclesiastes 3:1-14 on the left page of the Bible in Hebrew (reading from right to left).

The question in this part – 'is there any preference between wisdom and pleasure-seeking?' – comes out of the problem of life (Ecclesiastes 1:2–11) and two failed remedies (Ecclesiastes 1:12–18 and 2:1–11). The answer is given in verse 13–14 where on one hand, wisdom is better than pleasure-seeking, but on the other hand both are equally unable to deal with the problem of death.

The Apostle Paul offers an answer and consolation in the New Testament: "your labour in the Lord is not in vain" (1 Corinthians 15:58).

== The generous God (2:24–26) ==
So far God is only mentioned in Ecclesiastes 1:13, but in this part God is acknowledged as the 'controller of his world, creator of beauty, judge of injustices'. Therefore, the ability to perceive that one should enjoy life is 'a divine dispensation' given only to the righteous people who please God, whereas the remainders have to work on behalf of the righteous.

== See also ==
- Related Bible parts: Ecclesiastes 1, 1 Corinthians 15

== Sources ==
- Chilton, Bruce; Kee, Howard Clark; Meyers, Eric M.; Rogerson, John; Levine, Amy-Jill; Saldarini, Anthony J., eds. (2008). The Cambridge Companion to the Bible (2nd ed.). Cambridge University Press. ISBN 9780521691406.
- Eaton, Michael A. (1994). "Ecclesiastes". In Carson, D. A.; France, R. T.; Motyer, J. A.; Wenham, G. J. (eds.). New Bible Commentary: 21st Century Edition (4, illustrated, reprint, revised ed.). Inter-Varsity Press. pp. 609–618. ISBN 9780851106489.
- Halley, Henry H. (1965). Halley's Bible Handbook: an abbreviated Bible commentary (24th (revised) ed.). Zondervan Publishing House. ISBN 0-310-25720-4.
- Weeks, Stuart (2007). "20. Ecclesiastes". In Barton, John; Muddiman, John (eds.). The Oxford Bible Commentary (first (paperback) ed.). Oxford University Press. pp. 423–429. ISBN 978-0199277186.
- Würthwein, Ernst (1995). The Text of the Old Testament. Translated by Rhodes, Erroll F. Grand Rapids, MI: Wm. B. Eerdmans. ISBN 0-8028-0788-7.
