= R. T. France =

New Testament scholar and Anglican cleric (1938–2012)

The Reverend R. T. France
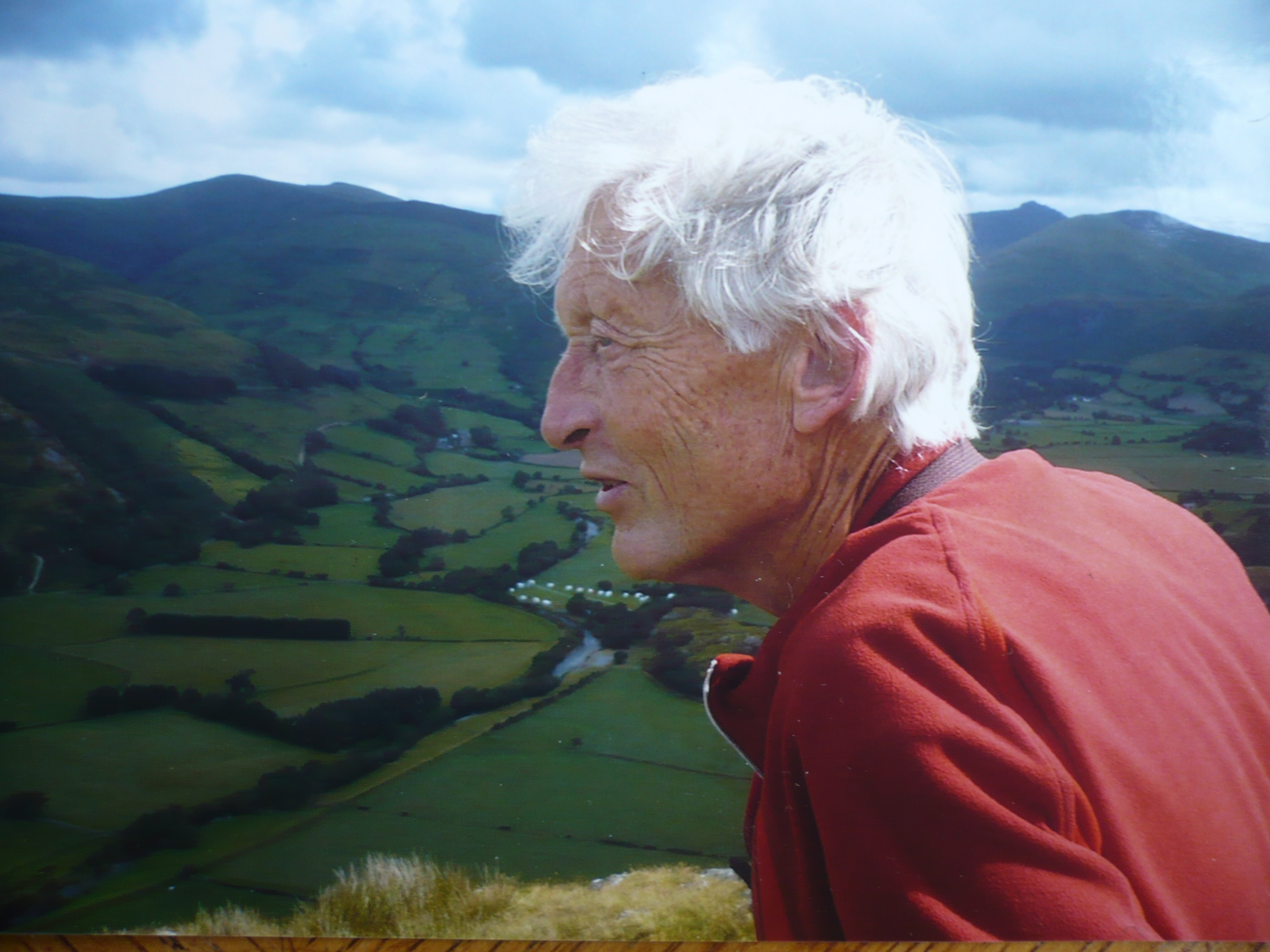
- Born: 2 April 1938; Derry, Northern Ireland
- Died: 10 February 2012 (aged 73); Llangelynin, Wales
- Spouse: Barbara

Ecclesiastical career
- Religion: Christianity (Anglican)
- Church: Church of England
- Ordained: 1966

Academic background
- Education: Balliol College, Oxford; University of London; Tyndale Hall

Academic work
- Discipline: Biblical studies
- Sub-discipline: New Testament
- School or tradition: Evangelical Anglicanism
- Institutions: University of Ife; Tyndale House; Ahmadu Bello University; London Bible College; Wycliffe Hall, Oxford

Richard Thomas France (1938–2012), known as R. T. France or Dick France, was a New Testament scholar and Anglican cleric. He was Principal of Wycliffe Hall, Oxford, from 1989 to 1995. He also worked for the London School of Theology.

== Biography ==
Richard T. (Dick) France was born on 2 April 1938. He was educated at Bradford Grammar School and Balliol College, Oxford (BA, 1960; MA 1963). He earned his BD at Tyndale Hall, University of London (1963), and his PhD at Tyndale Hall, Bristol (1967). He served pastoral charges in England and Wales from 1995 until his retirement in 1999. He died on 10 February 2012.

- Lecturer in Biblical Studies, University of Ife, Nigeria (1969–1973)
- Librarian, Tyndale House, Cambridge (1973–1976)
- Senior Lecturer in Religious Studies, Ahmadu Bello University (1976–1977)
- Warden, Tyndale House (1978–1981)
- Senior Lecturer, New Testament Studies (1981–1988); Vice-Principal (1983–1988) London Bible College
- Principal, Wycliffe Hall, Oxford University (1989–1995)
- Rector of Wentnor, Ratlinghope, Myndtown, Norbury, More, Lydham and Snead (1995–1999)
- Hon Canon Theologian of Ibadan Cathedral, Nigeria (1994–2012)
- Hon. Research Fellow, Bangor University (2004–2012)

He had been a member (since 1989; vice-chairman since 2005) of the Committee on Bible Translation responsible for the New International Version of the Bible (NIV), and for Today's New International Version (2005).

== Works ==
=== Books ===
- France, R. T. (1970). The Living God. London: Inter-Varsity Press. ISBN 0-87784-697-9.
- ——— (1971). Jesus and the Old Testament: His Application of Old Testament Passages to Himself and His Mission (1st ed.). London; Downers Grove, IL: Tyndale Press; Inter-Varsity Press. ISBN 0-85111-727-9.
- ——— (1975). The Man They Crucified: a Portrait of Jesus. London/Chicago: Inter-Varsity Press.
- ——— (1975). I Came to Set the Earth on Fire: a Portrait of Jesus. Downers Grove, IL: InterVarsity Press. ISBN 0-87784-642-1.
- ———; Wenham, David (1980–1983). Gospel Perspectives, vols 1-3. Sheffield, UK: Sheffield: JSOT Press. ISBN 978-1-59244-289-8.
- ——— (1982). Jesus and the Old Testament: His Application of Old Testament Passages to Himself and His Mission (re-issue ed.). Grand Rapids, MI: Baker Book House. ISBN 0-8010-3508-2.
- ——— (1985). The Gospel According to Matthew: An Introduction and Commentary. Tyndale New Testament Commentary. Vol. 1. Leicester, UK: Inter-Varsity Press. ISBN 0-8028-0063-7.
- ——— (1986). The Evidence for Jesus. London; Downers Grove, IL: Hodder & Stoughton; InterVarsity Press. ISBN 0-340-38172-8.
- ——— (1989). Matthew: Evangelist and Teacher. Exeter, UK: Paternoster. ISBN 1-59244-936-0.
- ——— (1989). The Man They Crucified: a Portrait of Jesus (revised ed.). Vancouver, BC: Inter-Varsity Press. ISBN 1-57383-236-7.
- ——— (1990). Divine Government: The Kingship of God in the Gospel of Mark. London: SPCK. ISBN 0-281-04471-6.
- ———; Carson, D. A.; Motyer, J. Alec; Wenham, Gordon J., eds. (1994). The New Bible Commentary: 21st-Century Edition (revised ed.). Leicester, UK; Downers Grove, IL: Inter-Varsity Press. ISBN 978-0851106489.
- ——— (1995). Women in the Church's Ministry: a Test-case for Biblical Interpretation. Didsbury Lectures. Carlisle, UK: Paternoster Press.
- ——— (1997). Women in the Church's Ministry: a Test-case for Biblical Interpretation. Didsbury Lectures (reissue ed.). Grand Rapids, MI: Eerdmans. ISBN 0-8028-4172-4.
- ——— (1998). The Gospel of Mark. Doubleday Bible Commentary series (1st ed.). New York: Doubleday. ISBN 0-385-49017-8.
- ——— (2000). Jesus and the Old Testament: His Application of Old Testament Passages to Himself and His Mission (republication ed.). Vancouver, BC: Regent College Publishing. ISBN 1-57383-006-2.
- ——— (2002). The Gospel of Mark: A Commentary on the Greek Text. New International Greek Testament Commentary. Grand Rapids, MI: Eerdmans. ISBN 0-8028-2446-3.
- ——— (2003). Divine Government: The Kingship of God in the Gospel of Mark (re-issue ed.). Vancouver, BC: Regent College Publishing. ISBN 1-57383-244-8.
- ——— (2007). The Gospel of Matthew. New International Commentary on the New Testament. Grand Rapids, MI: Eerdmans. ISBN 978-0-8028-2501-8.
- ——— (2007). Mark. Peabody, MA: Hendrickson Publishers. ISBN 978-1-59856-186-9.
- ——— (2007). Matthew: An Introduction and Commentary. Tyndale New Testament Commentaries. Vol. 1 (reissue ed.). Downers Grove, IL: InterVarsity Press. ISBN 978-0-8308-2980-4.
- ——— (2007). Timothy, Titus, and Hebrews. Peabody, MA: Hendrickson Publishers. ISBN 978-1-59856-195-1.
- ——— (2013). Luke. Teach the Text Commentary Series. Grand Rapids, MI: Baker Academic. ISBN 978-0-8010-9235-0.

=== Articles and chapters ===
- ——— (1965). "Henry Martyn". Five Pioneer Missionaries. London: Banner of Truth Trust. ISBN 978-0-851-51117-7. - Award-winning competition entry published in a collection of biographies.
- ——— (Autumn 1975). "Inerrancy and New Testament Exegesis". Themelios. 1 (1): 12–18.
- ——— (January 1989). "Matthew's Gospel in Recent Study". Themelios. 14 (2): 41–46.
- ——— (October 1992). "Development in New Testament Christology". Themelios. 18 (1): 4–8.

Academic offices
Preceded by Geoffrey Shaw	Principal of Wycliffe Hall, Oxford; 1989–1995	Succeeded by Alister McGrath
