= 1947 anti-Jewish riots in Aleppo =

Attack on Syrian Jews in Aleppo, Syria

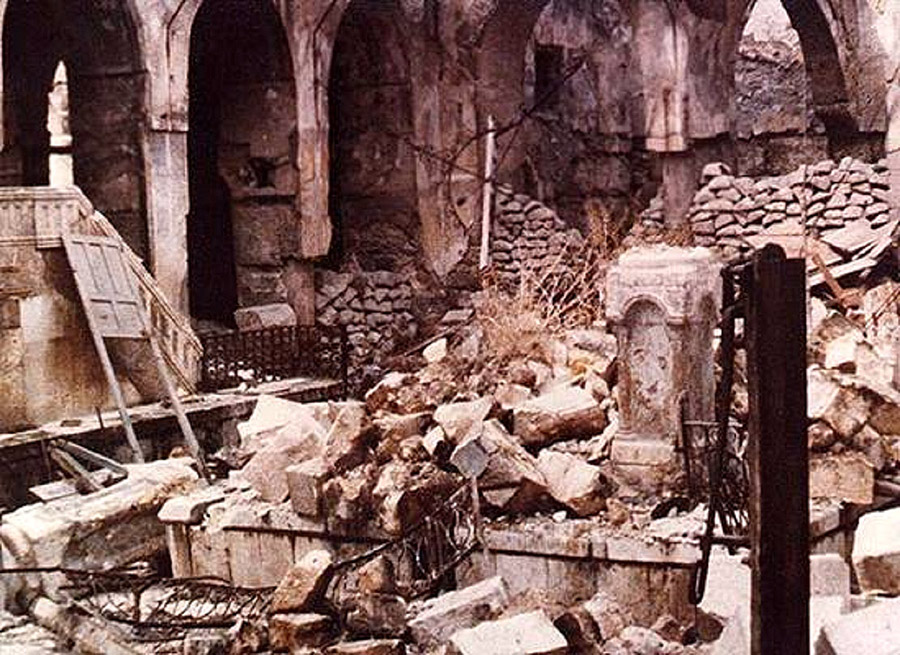
- Ruins of the Central Synagogue of Aleppo after it was burned during the 1947 riots in Aleppo
- Location: Aleppo, Syria
- Date: December 1947
- Attack type: Pogrom
- Victims: ~75 Jews killed Several hundred wounded ~5000 fled
- Perpetrators: Arab Syrians, Syrian government forces
- Motive: Antisemitism, Anti-zionism

The 1947 anti-Jewish riots in Aleppo were a mob attack on Syrian Jews in Aleppo, Syria in December 1947, following the United Nations vote in favour of partitioning British Palestine. The attack was part of an anti-Jewish wave of unrest across the Middle East and North Africa at the time of the 1948 Palestine war. Yaron Harel describes extensive looting and property damage, but writes that soldiers and police officers "prevented the mob from injuring and murdering Jews." According to Jacob Freid, the riots resulted in some 75 Jews murdered and several hundred wounded. In the aftermath of the riots, half the city's Jewish population fled the city.

== History ==
Syria gained independence from France in April 1946. The Haganah's illegal immigration operative Akiva Feinstein wrote in 1947 that the new Syrian government then commenced persecuting the Jewish minority, that all Jewish clerks working for the French bureaucracy were fired, and the government tried to stifle Jewish businesses. At the time of the United Nations vote on November 29, 1947, the Jewish community in Aleppo numbered around 10,000 and went back around two thousand years.

On November 30th the Syrian government closed the city and ordered all inhabitants to stay in their homes, which prevented violence. But on December 1st, two days after the vote in favour of the partition of Palestine, the government abetted and organised Aleppo's Arab inhabitants to attack the city's Jewish population. The exact number of those killed remains unknown, but estimates are put at around 75, with several hundred wounded. Ten synagogues, five schools, an orphanage and a youth club, along with several Jewish shops and 150 houses were set ablaze and destroyed. Damaged property was estimated to be valued at US$2.5m. During the riots the Aleppo Codex, an important medieval manuscript of the Torah, was lost and feared destroyed. The book reappeared (with 40% of pages missing) in Israel in 1958.

Following the attack, the Jewish community went into a steep decline. Wealthy Jews escaped the day after the riots and many more fled in small groups in subsequent months. Their property was forfeited and on December 22 the Syrian Government enacted a law forbidding Jews from selling their property. As of 2012, no Jews live in Aleppo.

=== Destruction of the Great Synagogue ===
In the early hours of December 1st Syrian Soldiers were sent to the Central Synagogue of Aleppo ostensibly to protect but in reality they were there only for the Syrian government to keep up appearances. Later that day, the local Jewish community leaders Rahmo Nehmad and Siahu Shamah met with Aleppo's mayor in which he promised to protect the Jews, though Shamah doubted that the mayor was being honest.

In the early afternoon a crowd of Arabs gathered in front of the Synagogue chanting "Palestine is our land and the Jews are our dogs" with the local authorities doing nothing in response. In the late afternoon the crowd of Arabs attacked with many of the soldiers sent to guard the synagogue joining the mob.

The mob took 40 Torah scrolls and 7 Hekhalot, tore them to pieces and then burned them in a bonfire. Nearly 2 thousand pairs of tefillin where also added to the fire. Firefighters soon arrived but instead of fighting the fire they threw kerosene and diesel onto the fire, only growing it.

The crowd then dispersed to attack and burn Jewish homes. Only in the morning did the Syrian government put an end to the rioting.

== See also ==
- 1945 Tripoli pogrom
- Farhud
- Jewish exodus from Arab and Muslim countries
- Menarsha synagogue attack
- Killings and massacres during the 1948 Palestine war
