= Aquila of Sinope =

2nd century translator of the Hebrew Bible into Greek

Aquila (Hebrew: עֲקִילַס ʿăqīlas, fl. 130 CE) of Sinope (modern-day Sinop, Turkey; Latin: Aquila Ponticus) was a translator of the Hebrew Bible into Greek, a proselyte, and disciple of Rabbi Akiva.

== Relationship to Onkelos ==
Opinions differ on whether he was the same person as Onkelos, who composed the leading Aramaic translation of the Torah known as the Targum Onkelos. The names "Onkelos the proselyte" and "Aquilas the proselyte" are frequently interchanged in the Babylonian Talmud and Jerusalem Talmud.

It is unclear how much (if any) of the Aramaic translation was based on the Greek.

== Greek translation ==
The inter-relationship between various significant ancient manuscripts of the Old Testament. LXX here denotes the original Septuagint.

Only fragments of this translation have survived in what remains of fragmentary documents taken from the Books of Kings and the Psalms found in the old Cairo Geniza in Fustat, Egypt, while excerpts taken from the Hexapla written in the glosses of certain manuscripts of the Septuagint were collected earlier and published by Frederick Field in his influential work, Origenis Hexaplorum quæ Supersunt, Oxford, 1875. Epiphanius' On Weights and Measures preserves a tradition that he was a kinsman of the Roman emperor Hadrian, who employed him in rebuilding Jerusalem as Aelia Capitolina, and that Aquila was converted from Roman paganism to Christianity but, on being reproved for practicing astrology, converted from Christianity to Judaism. He is said also to have been a disciple of Rabbi Akiva (d. ca. 132 CE).

In Jewish writings he is referred to as Aqilas (Hebrew: עקילס) and Onqelos (אונקלוס). Aquila's version is said to have been used in place of the Septuagint in Greek-speaking synagogues. The Christians generally disliked it, alleging that it rendered the Messianic passages incorrectly, but Jerome and Origen speak in its praise. Origen incorporated it in his Hexapla, alongside the Septuagint and the translations of Theodotion and Symmachus.

The Hexapla were the only known extant fragments of the work until 1897 when fragments of two codices were brought to the Cambridge University Library. These have been published: the fragments containing 1 Kings 20:7-17; 2 Kings 23:12-27 (signed as Aq^{Burkitt}) by Francis Crawford Burkitt in 1897, those containing parts of Psalms 90-103 (signed as Aq^{Taylor}) by C. Taylor in 1899. A fuller discussion appears in the Jewish Encyclopedia.

The surviving fragments of this translation and other translations forming part of Origen's Hexapla are now being republished with additional materials discovered since Field's edition by an international group of Septuagint scholars. This work is being carried out at the Oxford Centre for Late Antiquity as The Hexapla Project under the auspices of the International Organization for Septuagint and Cognate Studies, and directed by Peter J. Gentry (Southern Baptist Theological Seminary), Alison G. Salvesen (University of Oxford), and Bas ter Haar Romeny (Leiden University).
