= J. Alec Motyer =

Irish biblical scholar (1924–2016)

The Reverend J. Alec Motyer
- Born: John Alexander Motyer; 30 August 1924; Dublin, Ireland
- Died: 26 August 2016 (aged 91)

Ecclesiastical career
- Religion: Christianity (Anglican)
- Church: Church of England
- Ordained: 1947 (deacon); 1948 (priest)

Academic background
- Education: Trinity College, Dublin; Wycliffe Hall, Oxford

Academic work
- Discipline: Biblical studies
- School or tradition: Evangelical Anglicanism
- Institutions: Clifton College; Tyndale Hall; Trinity College, Bristol
- Notable works: The Prophecy of Isaiah (1993); Isaiah (1999)

John Alexander Motyer (30 August 1924 – 26 August 2016), known as J. Alec Motyer, was an Irish biblical scholar. He was Vice-Principal of Clifton Theological College and vicar of St. Luke's, Hampstead, and Christ Church, Westbourne (Bournemouth) (1981–1989), before becoming Principal of Trinity College, Bristol. He spent his later years in Poynton, Cheshire.

Motyer was born in Dublin on 30 August 1924 and educated at The High School, Dublin, before going to Trinity College, Dublin, where he received Bachelor of Arts, Master of Arts, and Bachelor of Divinity degrees. He trained to become an Anglican minister at Wycliffe Hall, Oxford.

Tremper Longman III describes him as a "competent and popular expositor", while Tim Keller has said that Motyer and Edmund Clowney were "the fathers of my preaching ministry". By contrast, Motyer's own opinion of himself was, "I’m not really a scholar. I’m just a man who loves the Word of God.”

He died on 26 August 2016.

== Published works ==
- ——— (1959). The Revelation of the Divine Name. Tyndale Old Testament lecture, 1956. London: Tyndale Press. OCLC 7051352.
- ——— (1966). The Richness of Christ: Studies in the Letter to the Phillippians. London: Inter-Varsity Fellowship. OCLC 1577277.
- Motyer, J. Alec; Guthrie, Donald; Davidson, Francis, eds. (1970). The New Bible Commentary, revised. Grand Rapids, MI: Eerdmans. OCLC 82785.
- ——— (1974). The Day of the Lion: The Message of Amos. Voice of the Old Testament (1st ed.). Downers Grove, IL: InterVarsity Press. ISBN 978-0-877-84766-3.
- ——— (1984). The Message of Philippians: Jesus Our Joy. Bible Speaks Today. Downers Grove, IL: InterVarsity Press. ISBN 978-0-877-84310-8.
- ——— (1985). The Message of James: The Tests of Faith. Bible Speaks Today. Downers Grove, IL: InterVarsity Press. ISBN 978-0-877-84292-7.
- ——— (1988). The Message of Amos: The Day of the Lion. Bible Speaks Today (2nd ed.). Downers Grove, IL: InterVarsity Press. ISBN 978-0-877-84283-5. - reissue of the 1974 title.
- ——— (1993). The Prophecy of Isaiah: An Introduction & Commentary. Downers Grove, IL: InterVarsity Press. ISBN 978-0-830-81593-7.
- ——— (1999). Isaiah. Tyndale Old Testament Commentaries. Downers Grove, IL: InterVarsity Press. ISBN 978-0-830-84220-9.
- ——— (2001). The Story of the Old Testament: Men with a Message. Grand Rapids, MI: Baker Books. ISBN 978-0-801-01230-3.
- ——— (2005). The Message of Exodus: The Days of Our Pilgrimage. Bible Speaks Today. Downers Grove, IL: InterVarsity Press. ISBN 978-0-830-82427-4.
- ——— (2009). Roots: Let the Old Testament Speak (revised ed.). Fearn, Ross-shire: Christian Focus Publications. ISBN 978-1-845-50506-6. - reissue of The Story of the Old Testament
- ——— (2011). Isaiah by the Day: A New Devotional Translation. Fearn, Ross-shire: Christian Focus Publications. ISBN 978-1-84550-654-4.
- ——— (2013). Preaching?: Simple Teaching on Simply Preaching. Fearn, Ross-shire: Christian Focus Publications. ISBN 978-1-781-91130-3.
- ——— (2016). Psalms by the Day: A New Devotional Translation. Fearn, Ross-shire: Christian Focus Publications. ISBN 978-1-781-91716-9.
- ——— (2016). Deuteronomy: At Journey's End. Leyland, Lancashire: 10Publishing. ISBN 978-1-911-27213-7.

Academic offices
New office	Principal of Trinity College, Bristol; 1971–1981	Succeeded by Joyce Baldwin
