= List of plants in the Bible =

This article lists plants referenced in the Bible, ordered alphabetically by English common/colloquial name. For plants whose identities are unconfirmed or debated the most probable species is listed first. Plants named in the Old Testament (Hebrew Bible or Tenakh) are given with their Hebrew name, while those mentioned in the New Testament are given with their Greek names.

== A ==
Name in Bible	Plant name	Scientific name	References
סנה səneh	Abraham's Bush or Blackberry	Vitex agnus-castus, Rubus sanctus or Loranthus acaciae	Exodus 3:2
שטה šiṭṭāh	Acacia, Spirale	Acacia raddiana	Exodus 25:10
אלמגים ’almuggîm	Almug tree; traditionally thought to denominate Red Sandalwood and/or White Sandalwood, but a few claim it is Juniper	Pterocarpus santalinus Santalum album Juniperus excelsa	2 Chronicles 2:8; 9:10, 11; 1 Kings 10:11, 12
שקד šāqêḏ	Almond	Amygdalus communis	Genesis 43:11
אהלים ’ăhālîm	Agarwood ("Aloe")	Aquilaria malaccensis	Proverbs 7:17
κρίνον, krinon	Anemone	Anemone coronaria	Matthew 6:28
ἄνηθον, anēthon	Anise or Dill	Pimpinella anisum, Anethum graveolens	Matthew 23:23
תפוח tappūaḥ	Apple (Note: To change a "p" to "f" in Hebrew a dot is changed; the word indicates that which is distinguished by its fragrance; it derives from the root "na·phach?" denoting "blow, pant, struggle for breath" (see Genesis 2:7; Job 31:39; Jeremiah 15:9); regarding this, M. C. Fisher wrote that "relationship [to na·phach?] seems at first semantically strained, but the ideas of 'breathe' and 'exhale an odor' are related. The by-form puah means both 'blow' (of wind) and 'exhale a pleasant odor, be fragrant.'" (see Proverbs 25:11)) or citron	Malus domestica or Citrus medica	Genesis 2:7; Job 31:39; Jeremiah 15:9

== B–E ==
Name in Bible	Plant name	Scientific name	References
בשם bōśem, בכא bəḵā’îm	Balsam	Commiphora gileadensis	Exodus, Songs
שערה śə‘ōrāh	Barley	Hordeum vulgare	Numbers 5:15; Ezekiel 4:9
אזרח ’ezrāḥ	Bay	Laurus nobilis	Psalm 37:35
בדלח bəḏōlaḥ	Bdellium	Commiphora africana	Genesis 2:12; Numbers 11:7
פול p̄ōl	Bean	Vicia faba	Ezekiel 4:9
תאשור ṯə’aššūr	Box	Buxus sempervirens	Isaiah 41:19
צן tsin	Boxthorn	Lycium europaeum	Proverbs 22:5
אטד ’āṭāḏ	Bramble	Rubus ulmifolius	Judges 9:15
רתם rōṯem	Broom	Calycotome villosa, Retama raetam or Spartium junceum	Psalm 120:4, 1 Kings 19:4
גמא gōme	Bulrush or Papyrus	Typha spp. Cyperus papyrus	Exodus 2:3, Job 40:21 (ABP and NETS)
אביונה ’ăḇîyōnāh	Caper, Desire	Capparis spinosa	Ecclesiastes 12:5
κεράτιον, keration	Carob and Locust	Ceratonia siliqua	Luke 15:16, Matthew 3:1
קדה qiddāh	Cassia	Cinnamomum iners	Exodus 30:24, Psalm 45:8, Job 42:14
קיקיון qîqāyōn	Castor Oil Tree ("Jonah's gourd")	Ricinus communis	Jonah 4:9
ארז ’ārez	Cedar of Lebanon	Cedrus libani	1 Kings 5:10, 2 Kings 19:23
קנמון qinnāmōn	Cinnamon	Cinnamomum zeylanicum	Proverbs 7:17
באשה ḇā’əšāh	Cockle or Stinkweed	Agrostemma githago	Job 31:40
גד gad	Coriander	Coriandrum sativum	Exodus 16:31
כרפס karpas	Cotton	Gossypium herbaceum	Esther 1:6
חבצלת ḥăḇatseleṯ	Crocus	Crocus sativus	Song of Solomon 2:1, Isaiah 35:1
קשא qiššu’a	Cucumber	Cucumis melo	Numbers 11:5
כמן kammōn; κύμινον, kuminon	Cumin	Cuminum cyminum	Isaiah 28:27
קצח qetsaḥ	Cumin, Black	Nigella sativa	Isaiah 28:27
תרזה tirzāh	Cypress	Cupressus sempervirens	Isaiah 44:14
ברוש bərōš	Cypress or fir	Cupressus sempervirens	Isaiah 44:14
תמר tāmār φοίνιξ, phoinix	Date Palm	Phoenix dactylifera	Song of Solomon 5:11; 7:7, 8, John 12:13
דביונים diḇyōnîm	Dove's Dung	Ornithogalum narbonense	2 Kings 6:25
תדהר tiḏhār	Elm	Ulmus minor subsp. canescens	Song of Solomon 5:11; 7:7, 8, John 12:13

== F–I ==
Name in Bible	Plant name	Scientific name	References
תאנה ṯə’ênāh συκῆν sykēn	Fig	Ficus carica	Joel 1:7 Mark 11:12 (also in Matthew 21:18-22)
ארן ’ōren	Fir	Abies cilicica	1 Kings etc.
פשתה pešeth	Flax	Linum usitatissimum	Proverbs 31:13
פרח peraḥ	Flowers, unidentified		1 Kings 7:26
לבונה ləḇōnāh	Frankincense	Boswellia thurifera	Matthew 2:10, 11
שום šūm	Garlic	Allium sativum	Numbers 11:5
ענב ‘ănāḇ	Grape	Vitis vinifera	Genesis 40:10 etc.
חציר ḥătsîr	Grass		Numbers 11:5
כמשכת חדק kimśuḵaṯ ḥāḏeq	Hedge of Thorns	Solanum incanum	Proverbs 15:19
ראש rōš	Hemlock or gall	Conium maculatum, Papaver somniferum	Amos 6:12
כפר kōp̄er	Henna	Lawsonia inermis	Song of Solomon 1:14
אזוב ’êzōḇ ὕσσωπος, hysōpos	Hyssop	Hyssopus officinalis	Leviticus 14:52
קטרת qaṭṭərāh	Incense	Boswellia sacra	Hosea 4:13
שושנ šōšannāh	Iris (then denominated "Lily")	Iris palaestina	1 Kings 7:22

== J–M ==
Name in Bible	Plant name	Scientific name	References
n/a	Judas Tree	Cercis siliquastrum	Matthew 27:5
ערוער ‘ărō‘êr	Juniper	Juniperus excelsa	Jeremiah 17:6, 48:6
ἄκανθα, akantha	Jujube	Ziziphus spina-christi	Matthew 27:29
חציר ḥātsîr	Leek	Allium porrum	Numbers 11:5
עדש ‘ăḏāša	Lentil	Lens esculenta	2 Samuel 17:28; Ezekiel 4:9
שושנת העמקים šōwōšannaṯ hā-‘ămāqîm	Lily-of-the-valley	Convallaria majalis	Song of Solomon 2:1
שש šêš	Linen	Linum usitatissimum	Exodus 35:25
צאל tse’ĕlîm	Lotus	Nelumbo nucifera	Job 40:21–22
מלוח mallūaḥ	Mallow	Atriplex halimus	Job 30:4
מלוח ḏūḏā’î	Mandrake	Mandragora autumnalis	Genesis 30:15
מן man	Manna	Alhagi camelorum	Numbers 11:7
ἡδύοσμον, hēduosmon	Mint	Mentha spp.	Matthew 23:23
σίναπι, sinapi	Mustard	Brassica nigra	Matthew 13:31
לט lōṭ	Myrrh	Commiphora guidotti	Genesis 37:25, 43:11
הדס hăḏas	Myrtle	Myrtus communis	Isaiah 55:13

== N–R ==
Name in Bible	Plant name	Scientific name	References
סרפד sirpaḏ	Nettle	Acanthus spinosus	Isaiah 55:13
בטן beten	Pistachio	Pistacia vera	Song of Solomon 6:11
אלון ’allōn	Oak	Quercus calliprinos	Joshua 24:26
זית zāyiṯ	Olive	Olea europaea	Judges 9:9
בצל bətsāl	Onion	Allium cepa	Numbers 11:5
ערמון ‘armōn	Plane	Platanus orientalis	Ezekiel 31:8, Genesis 30:37
רמון rimmōn	Pomegranate	Punica granatum	Song of Solomon 7:12
לבנה liḇneh	Poplar species	Populus spp.	Isaiah 44:4
חלמות ḥallāmūṯ	Purslane	Portulaca oleracea	Job 6:6
אבה ’êḇeh	Reed (see also Cane)	Phragmites	Ezekiel 40:vv., Job 40:21
πήγανον, pēganon	Rue	Ruta graveolens	Luke 11:42
אגמון ’aḡmōn	Rush	Juncus spp.	Isaiah 9:14

== S ==
Name in Bible	Plant name	Scientific name	References
כרכם karkōm	Saffron	Crocus sativus	Song of Solomon 4:14 (Note: referenced as the plant or the product consisting of its stigmas?)
כסמת kussemeṯ	Spelt	Triticum spelta	Isaiah 28:25; Ezekiel 4:9
נרד nêrəd	Spikenard	Nardostachys jatamansi	Song of Solomon 4:14
נטף nāṭāf	Stacte or Storax	Styrax officinalis, Liquidambar orientalis	Exodus 30:34
συκάμινος, sykaminos	Sycamine Fig-mulberry or Mulberry	Ficus sycomorus, Morus nigra or Morus alba	Luke 17:6

== T–Z ==
Name in Bible	Plant name	Scientific name	References
אשל ’ešel	Tamarisk	Tamarix aphylla	Genesis 21:33
ζιζάνιον, zizanion	"Tares", Darnel	Lolium temulentum	Matthew 13:25–40
אלה ’êlāh	Terebinth	Pistacia terebinthus	2 Samuel 18:9
חוח ḥōwaḥ	Thistle	Cardueae	Job 31:40, 2 Chronicles 25:18
קוצ qōts	Thorn, thornbush	Vachellia tortilis or similar	Jeremiah 4:3
θύϊνος, thyinos	Thyine Wood	Tetraclinis articulata	Revelation 18:12
עץ ‘êts	Timber		2 Kings 12:12
חבצלת השרון hă-ḇatseleṯ ha-Šārōn	Tulip Sharon	Tulipa agenensis	Song of Solomon 2:1
אגוז ’ĕḡōz	Walnut	Juglans regia	Song of Solomon 6:11, Genesis 43:11
אבטיח ’ăḇaṭṭiḥ	Watermelon	Citrullus lanatus	Numbers 11:5
חטה ḥiṭṭāh חנטא ḥinṭa’	Wheat	Triticum aestivum	Ezra 7:22; Ezekiel 4:9
ערב ‘ărāḇ	Willow	Salix alba	Job 40:22
ἄψινθος, apsinthos לענה la‘ănāh	Wormwood	Artemisia absinthium	Revelation 8:11

== See also ==
- Animals in the Bible
- Figs in the Bible

== Sources ==
- Hepper, F. Nigel (2000). Planting a Bible Garden (illustrated ed.). Lion Hudson PLC. ISBN 9781859851869.
- Post, G.E. Bible Dictionary Contributions
- Zohary, Michael (1982) Plants of the Bible. New York: Cambridge University Press.
