= Iolaus jacksoni =

Scientific classification
- Kingdom: Animalia
- Phylum: Arthropoda
- Class: Insecta
- Order: Lepidoptera
- Family: Lycaenidae
- Genus: Iolaus
- Species: I. jacksoni

Binomial name
- Iolaus jacksoni (Stempffer, 1950)

Synonyms
- Epamera jacksoni Stempffer, 1950; Iolaus (Epamera) jacksoni

Species of butterfly

Iolaus jacksoni, the Jackson's sapphire, is a butterfly in the family Lycaenidae. It is found in Ethiopia, central and western Kenya and central Tanzania. The habitat consists of arid savanna.

The larvae feed on Plicosepalus species including P. kalachariensis, P. meridianus, P. curviflorus and P. sagittifolius.
