= Peronospora anemones =

Scientific classification
- Domain: Eukaryota
- Clade: Sar
- Clade: Stramenopiles
- Phylum: Oomycota
- Class: Peronosporomycetes
- Order: Peronosporales
- Family: Peronosporaceae
- Genus: Peronospora
- Species: P. anemones

Binomial name
- Peronospora anemones Tramier, (1963)

Species of single-celled organism

Peronospora anemones is a plant pathogen. It causes downy mildew on leaves of anemone (Anemone spp.). It occurs on various wild and garden forms of anemone, and has particular commercial importance on Anemone coronaria grown for cut flowers, for example in France and Italy.
