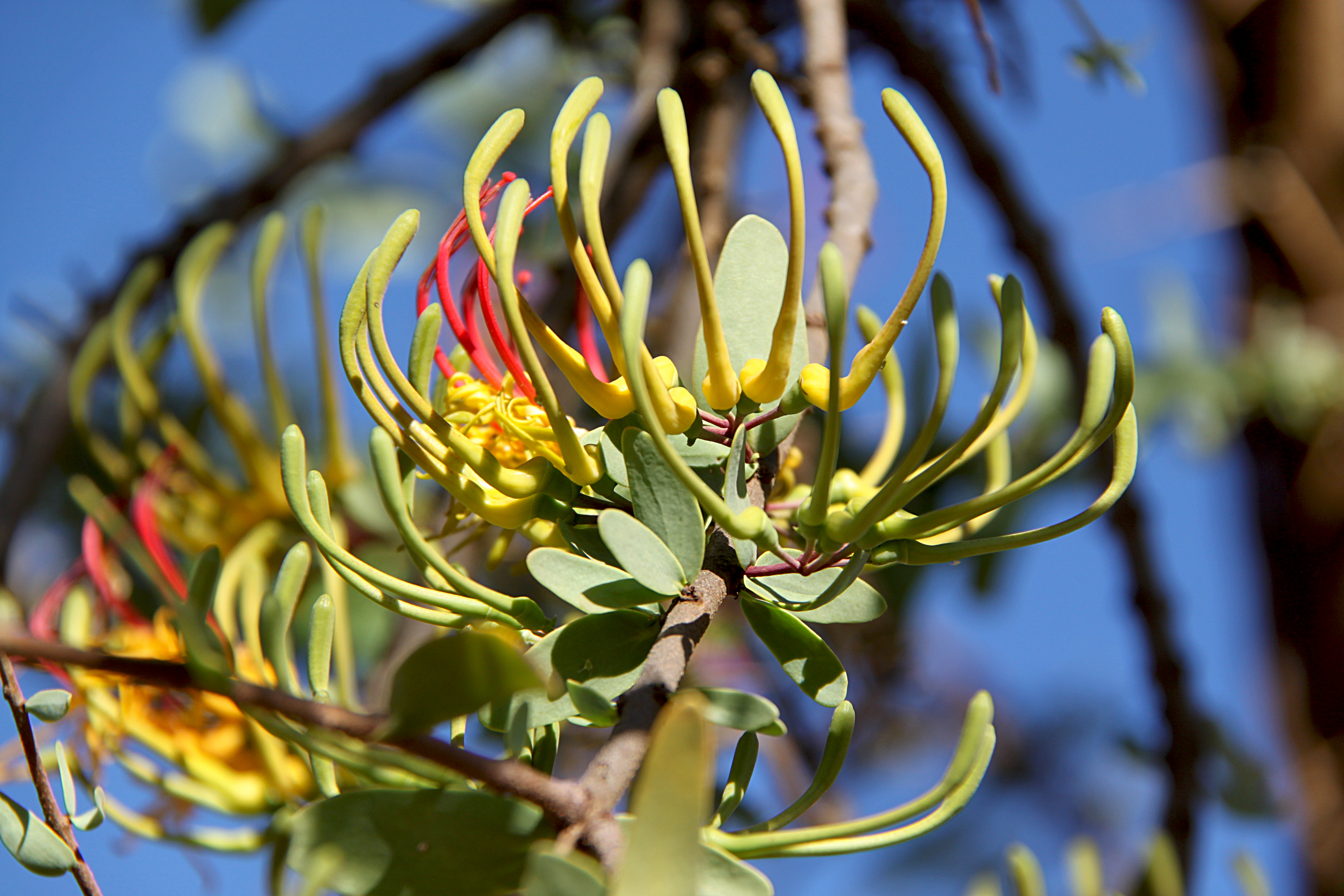

Scientific classification
- Kingdom: Plantae
- Clade: Tracheophytes
- Clade: Angiosperms
- Clade: Eudicots
- Order: Santalales
- Family: Loranthaceae
- Genus: Plicosepalus
- Species: P. sagittifolius

Binomial name
- Plicosepalus sagittifolius (Engl.) Danser

Synonyms
- Loranthus sagittifolius; Loranthus undulatus var. sagittifolius

= Plicosepalus sagittifolius =

Species of mistletoe

Plicosepalus sagittifolius is a woody, photosynthesising, parasitic plant species that grows on the branches of mostly Acacia-species, by means of tapping roots. It has glaucus, leathery, entire, 1–6 cm long leaves set oppositely along the stem, with umbels of initially long up-curved pale greenish-yellow buds, that open explosively, the petals usually bright yellow, strongly curling, long stamens and style clear red, orange or pink, and quickly falling after fertilisation. The initially green oval berries color red when ripe. The species is assigned to the showy mistletoe family. In the Afar language it is called hatote, while the vernacular name in the Oromo language is dertu dedacha.

== Description ==
Plicosepalus sagittifolius is a small hemiparasitic shrub of around 1 m in diameter, that grows on the branches of different Acacia-species, sometimes on Albizia and Commiphora. It has eighteen chromosomes (2n=18). The species is closely related to P. curviflorus.

=== Stems and leaves ===
Branches are greyish brown and carry opposite pairs of light greenish grey leaves, with mostly three (sometimes up to seven) obvious or obscure veins each, that come in two different types. Seated leaves, about 4–5 cm long and 0.6-1 cm wide, lanceolate to oval in shape, with an arrow- or heart-shaped foot 6–8 mm long, clasping the branch they sit on, occur on the long shoots, and are spaced about 3–4 cm from the neighboring pairs. Shorter leaves on very short (1–3 mm long) stalks are arranged on the short shoots, that may also carry the inflorescences.

=== Flowers ===
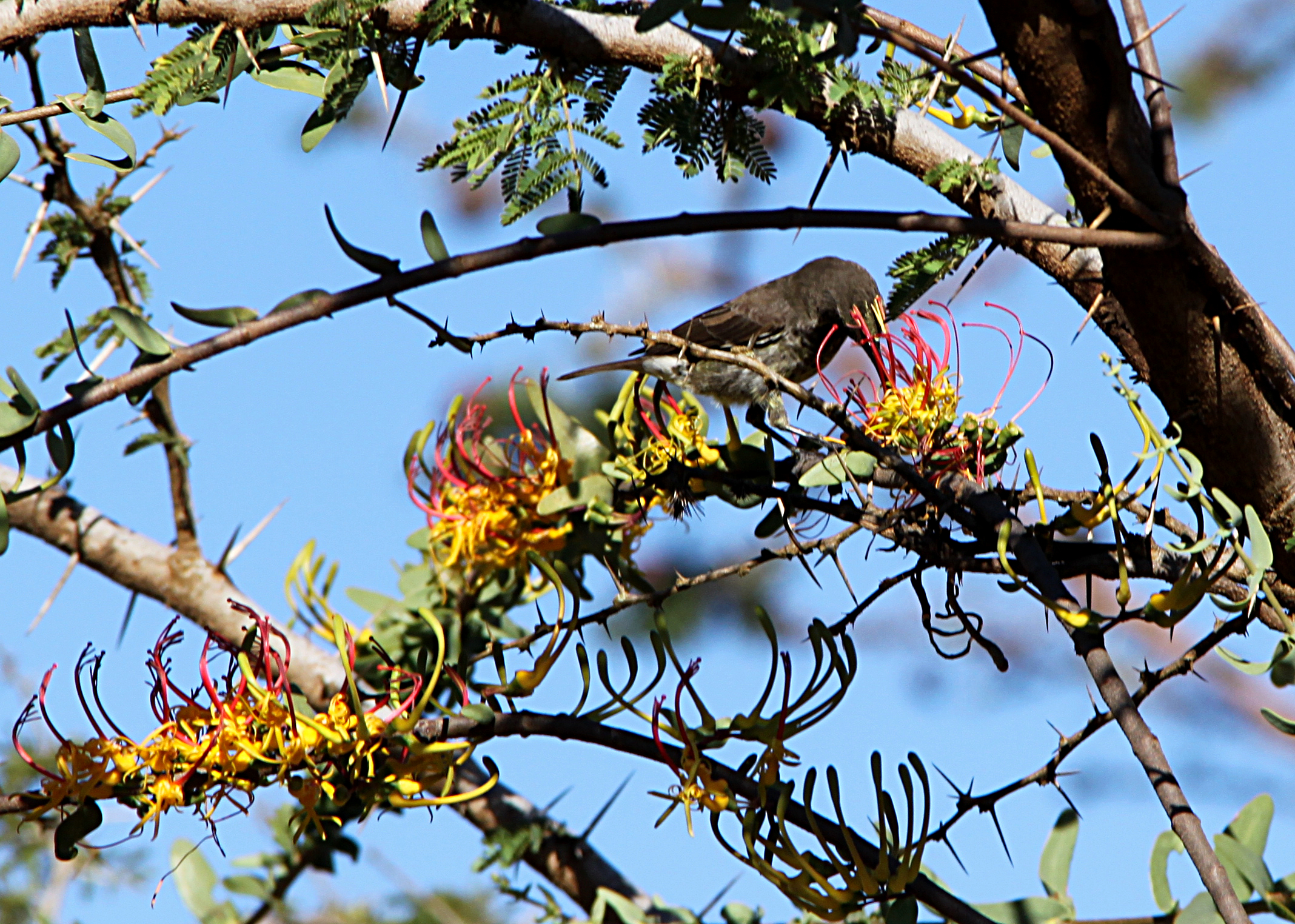
P. sagittifolium parasitising on Acacia drepanolobium, being pollinated by a female scarlet-chested sunbird (Chalcomitra senegalensis)

One or a few umbels of three to seven (sometimes up to twelve) flowers each on a dull purple common stalk of 0.5–1.7 cm long are set at the tip of the short shoots, which are leafy at their base. The dull purple stalks of the individual flowers are 0.5–1 cm long. The fully developed flowerbuds are 4.5–5 cm long, have a thickened, campanulate, green receptacle of 2.5–4 mm long, on top of which is an inconspicuous green ring-shaped calyx of 0.5–1 mm high. The corona is a greenish yellow, in the lower 6–8 mm widened and slightly S-shaped, further to the tip an up-curved tube of 3–3.5 cm long, and again wider at the tip. The corona opens suddenly into fully free petals that are strongly curled at the receptacle, initially bright yellow and sometimes reddish at the foot, remaining yellow or aging to orange-red. When open, the orange, pink or red filaments topped by 7–9 mm long anthers become visible. Style and stigma are equally bright red as the stamens.

=== Fruits ===
The receptacles develop into smooth oval berries of approximately 1 cm long and 0.7 cm in diameter, initially green but becoming red when ripe.

== Taxonomy ==
Adolf Engler described Loranthus undulatus var. sagittifolius in 1895. Thomas Archibald Sprague regarded this plant sufficiently different from Loranthus undulatus (now renamed Plicosepalus undulatus) to raise its rank to species, and so created Loranthus sagittifolius. Benedictus Hubertus Danser, who revised the subfamily Loranthoideae in 1933, reassigned the species to the genus Plicosepalus, making the new combination P. sagittifolius.

=== Etymology ===
The simple translation of the root words in Plicosepalus (from the Latin plicatus, meaning "folded") is "plied sepal". The species epithet sagittifolius is also derived from Latin words, sagitta meaning "arrow", and folium meaning "leaf", presumably because some of its leaves are arrow-shaped.

== Distribution ==
Plicosepalus sagittifolius occurs in a wide zone in the east of tropical Africa, from South Africa (eastern Transvaal), Zambia, Malawi, coastal regions from southern Somalia via Kenya and Tanzania to northern Mozambique, and inland to the Rift Valley region from southern Ethiopia via Kenya and Uganda to southern Tanzania.

== Habitat ==
Plicosepalus sagittifolius grows at altitudes of 30-2300 m.

== Ecology ==
In Ethiopia, Plicosepalus sagittifolius can be found in coastal and deciduous bushland, Acacia and Acacia-Commiphora bushland and woodland. The most common hosts are Acacia mellifera and other Acacia-species, but it sometimes also parasitises on Albizia or Commiphora. The caterpillars of Iolaus jacksoni, Jackson's sapphire, feed on Plicosepalus-species, including P. sagittifolius.

== Use ==
In Tanzania, Plicosepalus sagittifolius has been used in traditional medicine to treat cancer. The plant is used to soften leather, while branches are utilised as firewood.
