= Ezekiel 4 =

Book of Ezekiel, chapter 4

- ← chapter 3 chapter 5 →
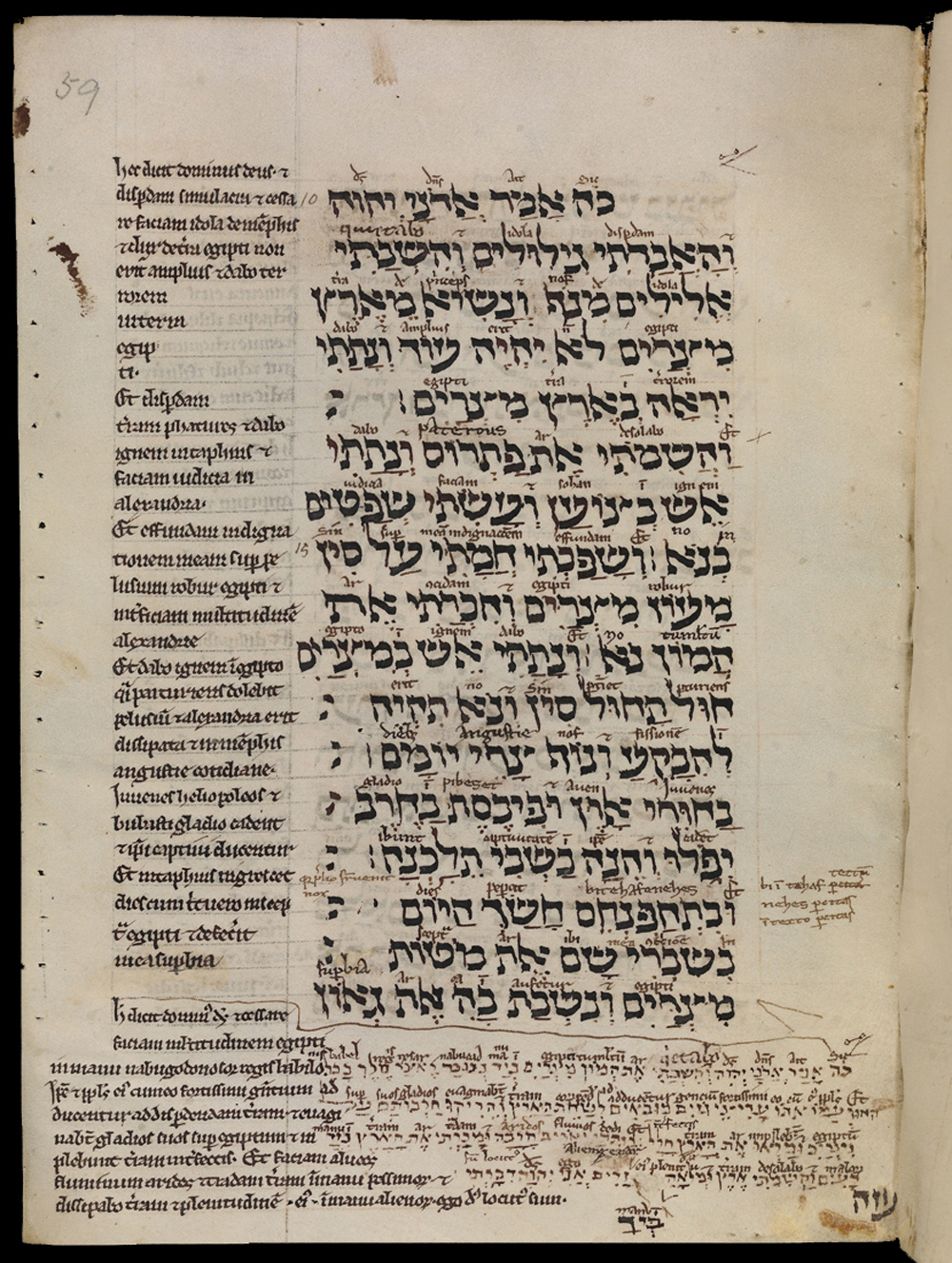
- Book of Ezekiel 30:13–18 in an English manuscript from the early 13th century, MS. Bodl. Or. 62, fol. 59a. A Latin translation appears in the margins with further interlineations above the Hebrew.
- Book: Book of Ezekiel
- Hebrew Bible part: Nevi'im
- Order in the Hebrew part: 7
- Category: Latter Prophets
- Christian Bible part: Old Testament
- Order in the Christian part: 26

Ezekiel 4 is the fourth chapter of the Book of Ezekiel in the Hebrew Bible or the Old Testament of the Christian Bible. This book is one of the Books of the Prophets and contains the prophecies attributed to the prophet/priest Ezekiel. In this chapter, following God's command, Ezekiel performs a sign-act, a symbolic representation of the siege of Jerusalem and resulting famine.

== Text ==
The original text was written in Biblical Hebrew. This chapter is divided into 17 verses.

=== Textual witnesses ===
Some early manuscripts containing the text of this chapter in Hebrew are of the Masoretic Text tradition, which includes the Codex Cairensis (895), the Petersburg Codex of the Prophets (916), Aleppo Codex (10th century), and Codex Leningradensis (1008). Fragments containing parts of this chapter were found among the Dead Sea Scrolls including 1Q9 (1QEzek; Pre 68 CE) with extant verses 15–17; and 11Q4 (11QEzek; 50 BCE–50 CE) with extant verses 3–6, 9–10.

There is also a translation into Koine Greek known as the Septuagint, made in the last few centuries BC. Extant ancient manuscripts of the Septuagint version include Codex Vaticanus (B; $\mathfrak{G}$^{B}; 4th century), Codex Alexandrinus (A; $\mathfrak{G}$^{A}; 5th century) and Codex Marchalianus (Q; $\mathfrak{G}$^{Q}; 6th century). (Note: Ezekiel is missing from Codex Sinaiticus.)

== The Siege of Jerusalem (4:1–8) ==
This part describes how Ezekiel enacts the Siege of Jerusalem, by first drawing a map of Jerusalem on a clay tablet or a brick, then building a model of the siege apparatus encircling the model city, and finally setting up an iron plate as a wall between the city and himself, facing the city to start the siege to it.

=== Verse 1 ===
"You also, son of man, take a clay tablet and lay it before you, and portray on it a city, Jerusalem."

- "Clay tablet" (KJV: "tile"): or "brick", laterem in Pagninus' translation and in the Latin Vulgate edition.
- "Portray on it": to draw the city of Jerusalem.

=== Verse 5 ===
For I have laid on you the years of their iniquity, according to the number of the days, three hundred and ninety days; so you shall bear the iniquity of the house of Israel.

- "390 days" signifies the 390 years of pre-siege punishment for Israel in the land (cf. Leviticus 26:14–32). The Greek text (Septuagint) has "190 years".

=== Verse 6 ===
And when you have completed them, lie again on your right side; then you shall bear the iniquity of the house of Judah forty days. I have laid on you a day for each year.

- "40 days" signifies the 40 years of post-siege punishment for Judah in exile (cf. Numbers 14:34).

== Famine (4:9–17) ==
In this part, Ezekiel acts out the role of Jerusalem's citizens, eating meager rations of food to symbolize famine, even baking cakes over dung to emphasize the severity.

=== Verse 9 ===
Also take for yourself wheat, barley, beans, lentils, millet, and spelt; put them into one vessel, and make bread of them for yourself. During the number of days that you lie on your side, three hundred and ninety days, you shall eat it.

- "Millet and spelt": considered inferior kinds of wheat. These and other mentioned materials (barley, beans, lentils) were commonly gathered for food in the area where Ezekiel was exiled (Mesopotamia).

=== Verse 10 ===
And your food which you eat shall be by weight, twenty shekels a day; from time to time you shall eat it.

- "Twenty shekels": about 8 ounces (230 g), is the ration of bread per person per day, showing the great scarcity. "Shekel" is the standard for weighing (including for money) in the ancient Near East; generally represents 11.5 grams (0.4 ounce).

=== Verse 11 ===
You also shall drink water by measure, the sixth part of a hin. From time to time you shall drink it.

- "The sixth part of a hin": about 2/3 US quart (0.6 L); a daily water ration showing restricted access to water source.

=== Verse 12 ===
And you shall eat it as barley cakes; and bake it using fuel of human waste in their sight.
"Using fuel of human waste": Barley cakes were baked on stones (cf. 1 Kings 19:6) heated with fire using a fuel of animal dung, often mixed with straw. "Human waste" was considered 'ritually unclean' and had to be buried outside the camp of the Israelites (just as during the wilderness wandering) to prevent 'defilement' (Deuteronomy 23:12–14).

== See also ==
- Jerusalem
- List of plants in the Bible
- Son of man
- Related Bible parts: Jeremiah 27, Jeremiah 28, Jeremiah 29, 1 Thessalonians 5, 1 Peter 4

== Sources ==
- Carley, Keith W. (1974). The Book of the Prophet Ezekiel. Cambridge Bible Commentaries on the New English Bible (illustrated ed.). Cambridge University Press. ISBN 9780521097550.
- Coogan, Michael David (2007). Cooganv, Michael David; Brettler, Marc Zvi; Newsom, Carol Ann; Perkins, Pheme (eds.). The New Oxford Annotated Bible with the Apocryphal/Deuterocanonical Books: New Revised Standard Version, Issue 48 (Augmented 3rd ed.). Oxford University Press. ISBN 9780195288810.
- Fitzmyer, Joseph A. (2008). A Guide to the Dead Sea Scrolls and Related Literature. Grand Rapids, MI: William B. Eerdmans Publishing Company. ISBN 9780802862419.
- Galambush, J. (2007). "25. Ezekiel". In Barton, John; Muddiman, John (eds.). The Oxford Bible Commentary (first (paperback) ed.). Oxford University Press. pp. 533–562. ISBN 978-0199277186.
- Joyce, Paul M. (2009). Ezekiel: A Commentary. Continuum. ISBN 9780567483614.
- Ulrich, Eugene, ed. (2010). The Biblical Qumran Scrolls: Transcriptions and Textual Variants. Brill.
- Würthwein, Ernst (1995). The Text of the Old Testament. Translated by Rhodes, Erroll F. Grand Rapids, MI: Wm. B. Eerdmans. ISBN 0-8028-0788-7.
