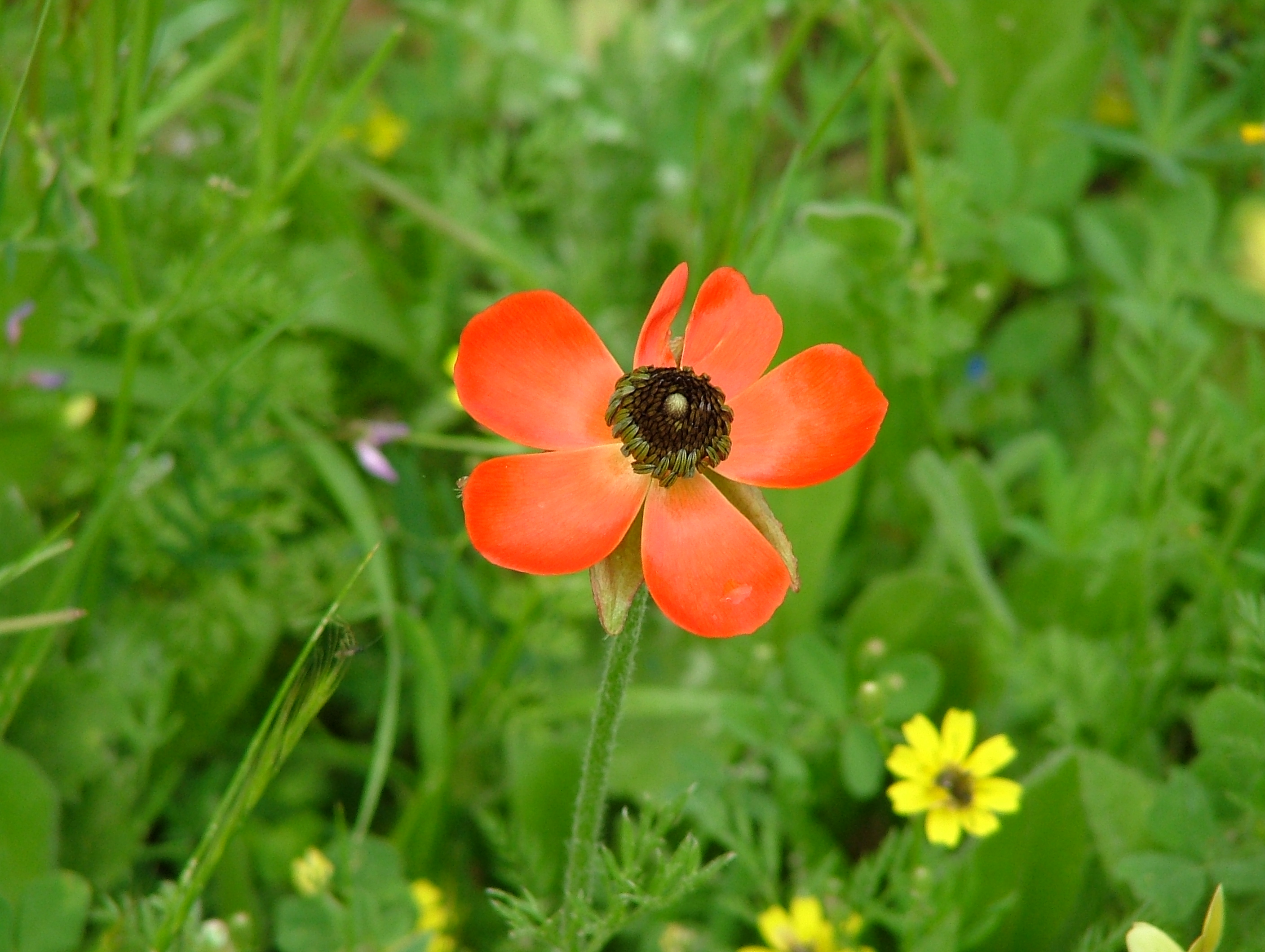

Scientific classification
- Kingdom: Plantae
- Clade: Embryophytes
- Clade: Tracheophytes
- Clade: Angiosperms
- Clade: Eudicots
- Order: Ranunculales
- Family: Ranunculaceae
- Genus: Ranunculus
- Species: R. asiaticus

Binomial name
- Ranunculus asiaticus L.

= Ranunculus asiaticus =

Species of buttercup

Heart of Gold, a cultivated form of Ranunculus asiaticus

Ranunculus asiaticus, the Persian buttercup, is a species of buttercup (Ranunculus) native to the eastern Mediterranean region, southwestern Asia, southeastern Europe (Crete, Karpathos and Rhodes), and northeastern Africa.

It is a herbaceous perennial plant growing up to 45 cm (18 in) tall, with simple or branched stems. The basal leaves are three-lobed, with leaves higher on the stems more deeply divided; like the stems, they are downy or hairy. The flowers are 3 to 5 cm (1.2 to 2.0 in) cm in diameter, variably red to pink, yellow, or white, with one to several flowers on each stem.

It is a protected species in some jurisdictions, such as Palestine.

== Cultivation and uses ==
Double-flowered forms, which are likely hybrids, are a popular ornamental plant in gardens, and widely used in floristry. Numerous cultivars have been selected, including 'Bloomingdale', 'Picotee', 'Pot Dwarf', and 'Superbissima'. The plants can tolerate light frost, but are not hardy at temperatures below -10°C.

'Tecolote' and 'Bloomingdale' are examples of the double-flowered plants. The single-flowered species form is not commercially cultivated on any significant scale. By contrast, the similar-looking Anemone coronaria is widely available in single-flower 'De Caen' hybrid forms. However, as with Ranunculus asiaticus, the species form, which also has red single flowers, is not commercially cultivated.

== Recognition ==
On March 1, 2023, Canada Post, Canada's postal administration, issued a postage stamp depicting Ranunculus asiaticus. The stamp was issued in booklets and rolls and as a souvenir sheet.
