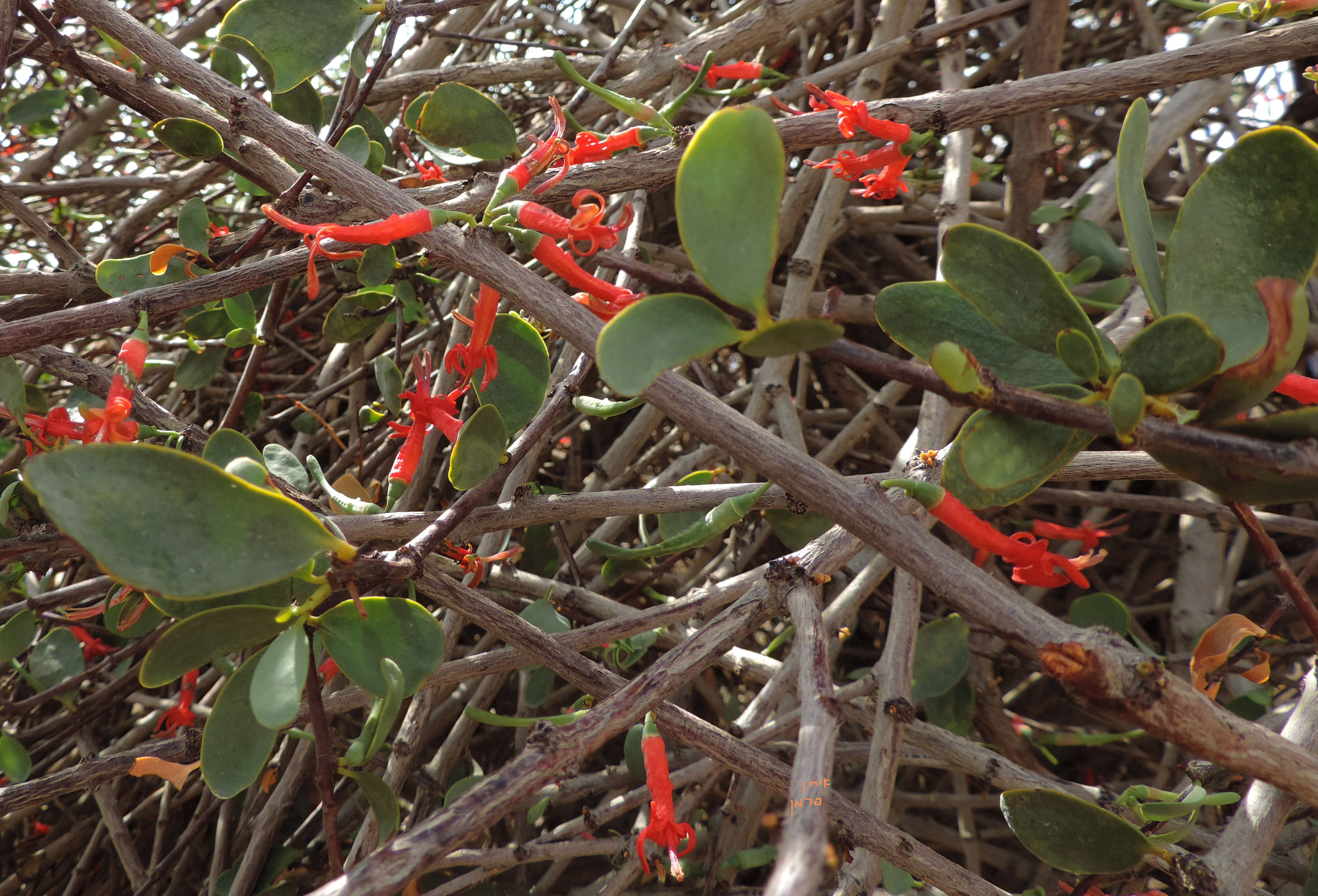
- On umbrella thorn acacia in the Jordan Rift Valley

Scientific classification
- Kingdom: Plantae
- Clade: Tracheophytes
- Clade: Angiosperms
- Clade: Eudicots
- Order: Santalales
- Family: Loranthaceae
- Genus: Plicosepalus
- Species: P. acaciae

Binomial name
- Plicosepalus acaciae (Zucc.) Wiens & Polhill

Synonyms
- List: Loranthus acaciae Zucc.; Loranthus arabicus Deflers; Loranthus gibbosulus A.Rich.; Loranthus laetus R.Br.; Loranthus venustus Fenzl ex Eichler; Tapinostemma acaciae (Zucc.) Tiegh.; Tapinostemma arabicum (Deflers) Tiegh.; Tapinostemma venustum (Fenzl ex Eichler) Tiegh.

= Plicosepalus acaciae =

Species of flowering plant

Plicosepalus acaciae (syn. Loranthus acaciae), the acacia strap flower or acacia mistletoe, is a species of hemiparasitic flowering plant in the family Loranthaceae. It is native to northeastern Africa, the Levant, and the Arabian Peninsula. As its common and scientific names suggest, it parasitizes acacias; Vachellia tortilis subsp. raddiana (formerly Acacia raddiana) and V. t. subsp. tortilis (formerly A. tortilis). It seeds are dispersed by the white-spectacled bulbul (Pycnonotus xanthopygos) and grow directly out of the bark of the acacia tree. It also commonly provides nectar for the Palestine sunbird.
