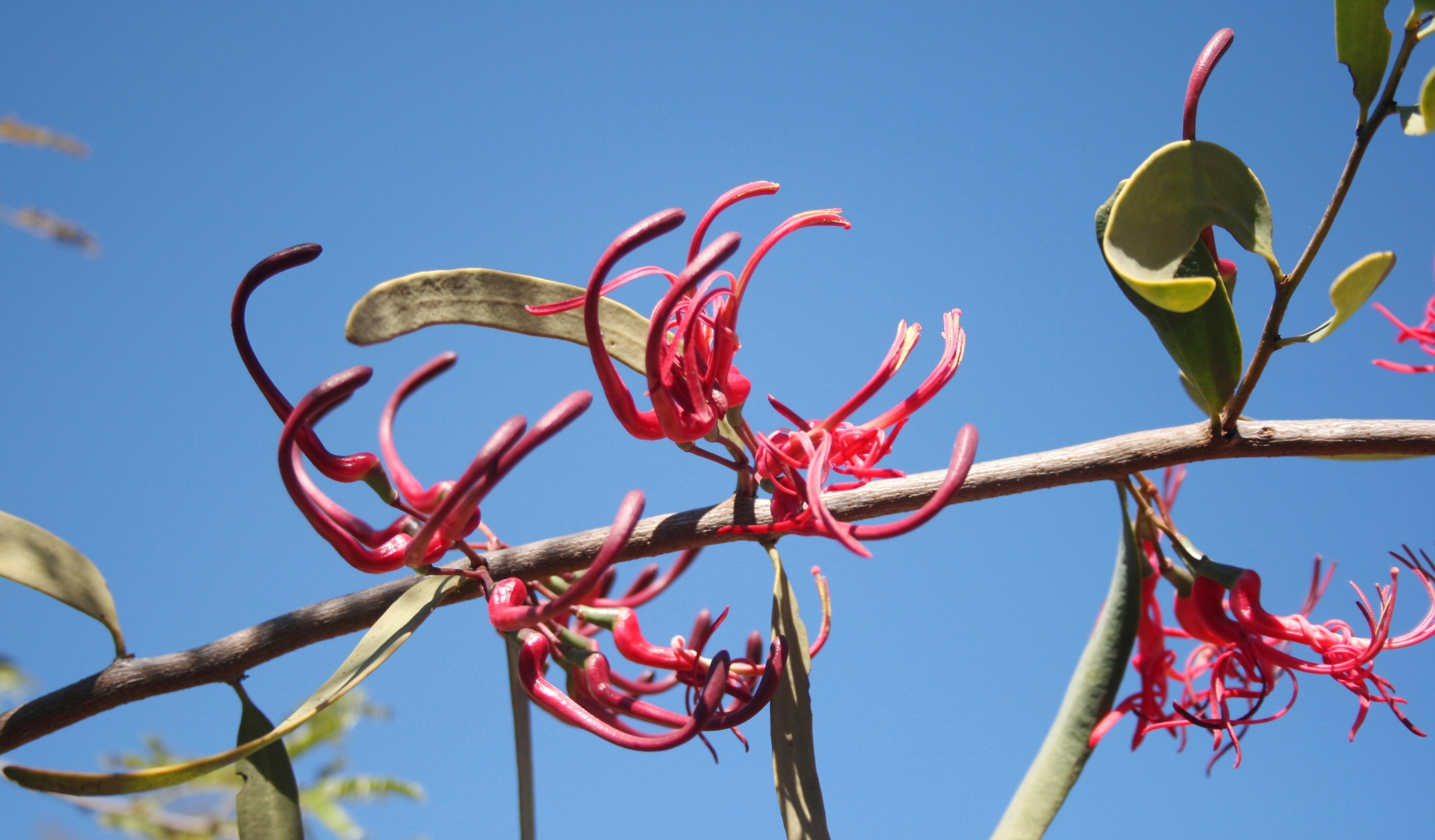
- Plicosepalus kalachariensis

Scientific classification
- Kingdom: Plantae
- Clade: Tracheophytes
- Clade: Angiosperms
- Clade: Eudicots
- Order: Santalales
- Family: Loranthaceae
- Genus: Plicosepalus; Tiegh.

= Plicosepalus =

Genus of plants

Plicosepalus is a genus of hemiparasitic flowering plants belonging to the family Loranthaceae.

Members of the genus are native range to eastern, central and southern Africa, the Levant, and the Arabian Peninsula.

Species:

- Plicosepalus acaciae (Zucc.) Wiens & Polhill
- Plicosepalus amplexicaulis Wiens
- Plicosepalus curviflorus (Benth. ex Oliv.) Tiegh.
- Plicosepalus foliosus Wiens & Polhill
- Plicosepalus kalachariensis (Schinz) Danser
- Plicosepalus meridianus (Danser) Wiens & Polhill
- Plicosepalus ogadenensis M.G.Gilbert
- Plicosepalus robustus Wiens & Polhill
- Plicosepalus sagittifolius (Engl.) Danser
- Plicosepalus somalensis Wiens & Polhill
- Plicosepalus undulatus (E.Mey. ex Harv.) Tiegh.
