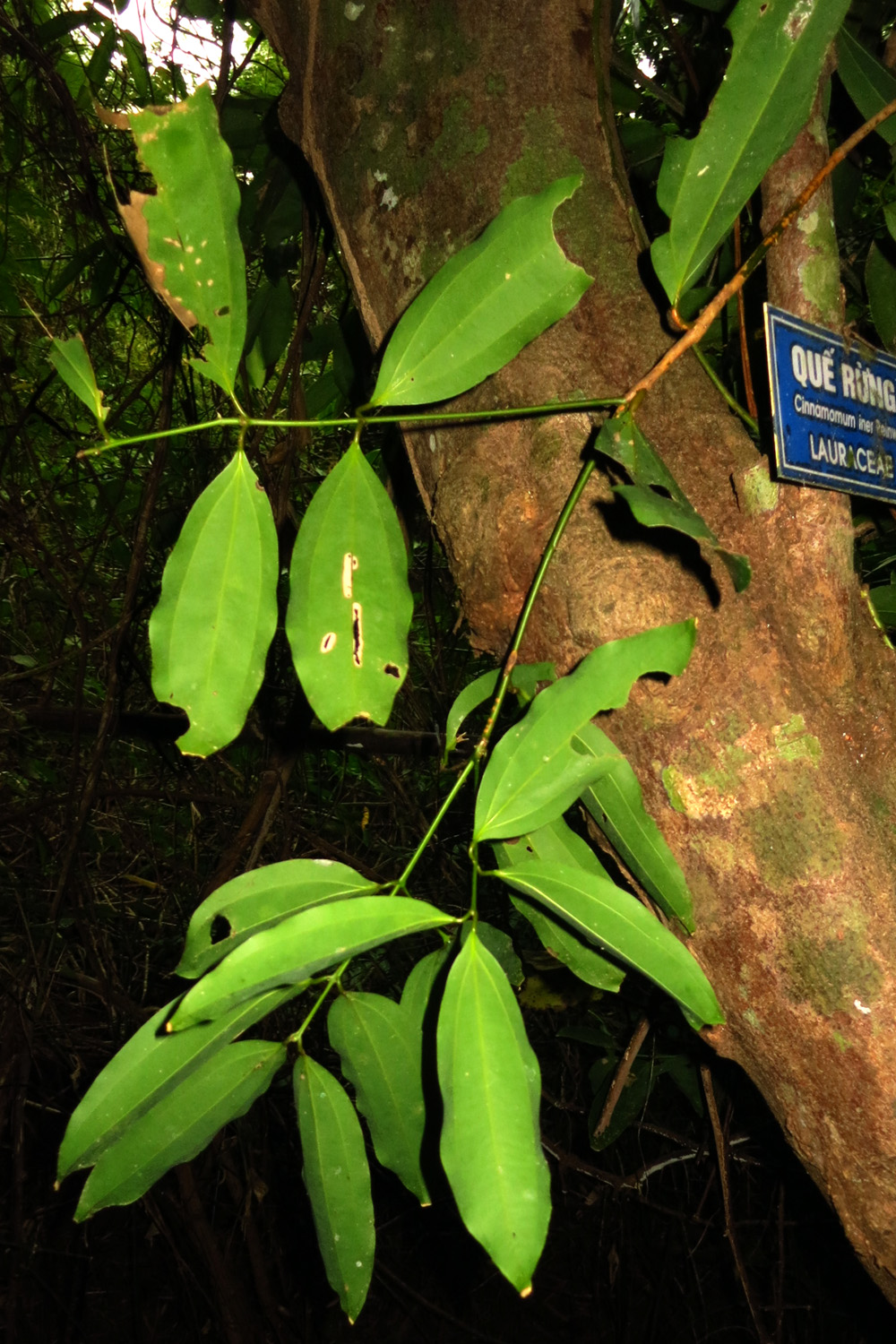
- Trunk and leaves of specimen tree in Cat Tien National Park
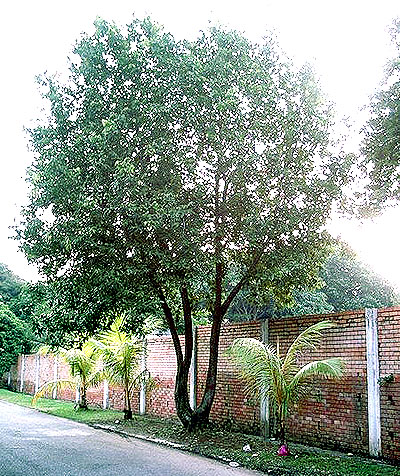
- Tree in Malaysia

Conservation status
- Least Concern (IUCN 3.1)

Scientific classification
- Kingdom: Plantae
- Clade: Tracheophytes
- Clade: Angiosperms
- Clade: Magnoliids
- Order: Laurales
- Family: Lauraceae
- Genus: Cinnamomum
- Species: C. iners

Binomial name
- Cinnamomum iners (Reinw. ex Nees & T.Nees) ex Blume

Synonyms
- List: Camphora grifiithii var. lanceolata Lukman.; Cinnamomum aromaticum Zoll.; Cinnamomum calyculatum Miq.; Cinnamomum dasyanthum Miq.; Cinnamomum eucalyptoides Nees; Cinnamomum gracile Miq., nom. illeg. superfl.; Cinnamomum griffithii Meisn.; Cinnamomum iners var. angustifolium Ridl.; Cinnamomum iners var. latum Blume; Cinnamomum javanicum var. neglectum (Blume) Meisn.; Cinnamomum manillarum Lukman.; Cinnamomum neglectum Blume; Cinnamomum nitidum f. angustifolium Miq.; Cinnamomum nitidum f. borneense Miq.; Cinnamomum nitidum var. curtisii Lukman.; Cinnamomum nitidum var. iners (Reinw. ex Nees & T.Nees) Miq.; Cinnamomum nitidum var. oblongifolium Blume; Cinnamomum nitidum var. spurium Blume; Cinnamomum nitidum var. subcuneatum Blume; Cinnamomum rauwolfii Blume; Cinnamomum reinwardtii Miq.; Cinnamomum subcuneatum Miq.; Laurus caryophyllata Reinw. ex Meisn.; Laurus cassia Nees; Laurus culillaban Buch.-Ham.; Laurus iners Reinw. ex Nees; Laurus malabathrum Lam.; Laurus malabathrum Wall. ex Nees; Laurus nitida Roxb. (Nom. Illeg.)

= Cinnamomum iners =

Species of plant

Cinnamomum iners is a tree species in the family Lauraceae described by Reinwardt and Blume. No subspecies are listed in the Catalogue of Life. It occurs naturally in Myanmar, Thailand, Laos, Cambodia, Vietnam, Malaysia, Indonesia, Brunei, Singapore, the Philippines and southern China.

In Malay C. iners is called pokok medang teja; in Vietnamese it may be called: quế rừng, quế giả, quế lá to, quế lợn, hậu phác, or hậu phác nam.

== Description ==
Cinnamomum iners is an evergreen tree growing up to 20 m in height; the branches have opposite twigs, robust and angular, sometimes tetragonal, glabrescent. Leaves are subopposite, ovate to elliptic, measuring 120–350 mm long and 60–85 mm broad. They are glabrous and the base of the leaf is wedge-shaped with a blunt apex (see illustrations); petioles are more or less pubescent, have a reddish brown colour and 10–30 mm in length. Flowers small and bisexual, pubescent, grouped in axillary or terminal panicles; these inflorescences are 60–260 mm in length. Fruits are ovoid in shape, typically 10 mm long and 7 mm in width. Trees bloom and start to bear fruit from March to June.

== Habitat ==
This species grows in moist woods and thickets, up to 1000 metres elevation.

== Gallery ==
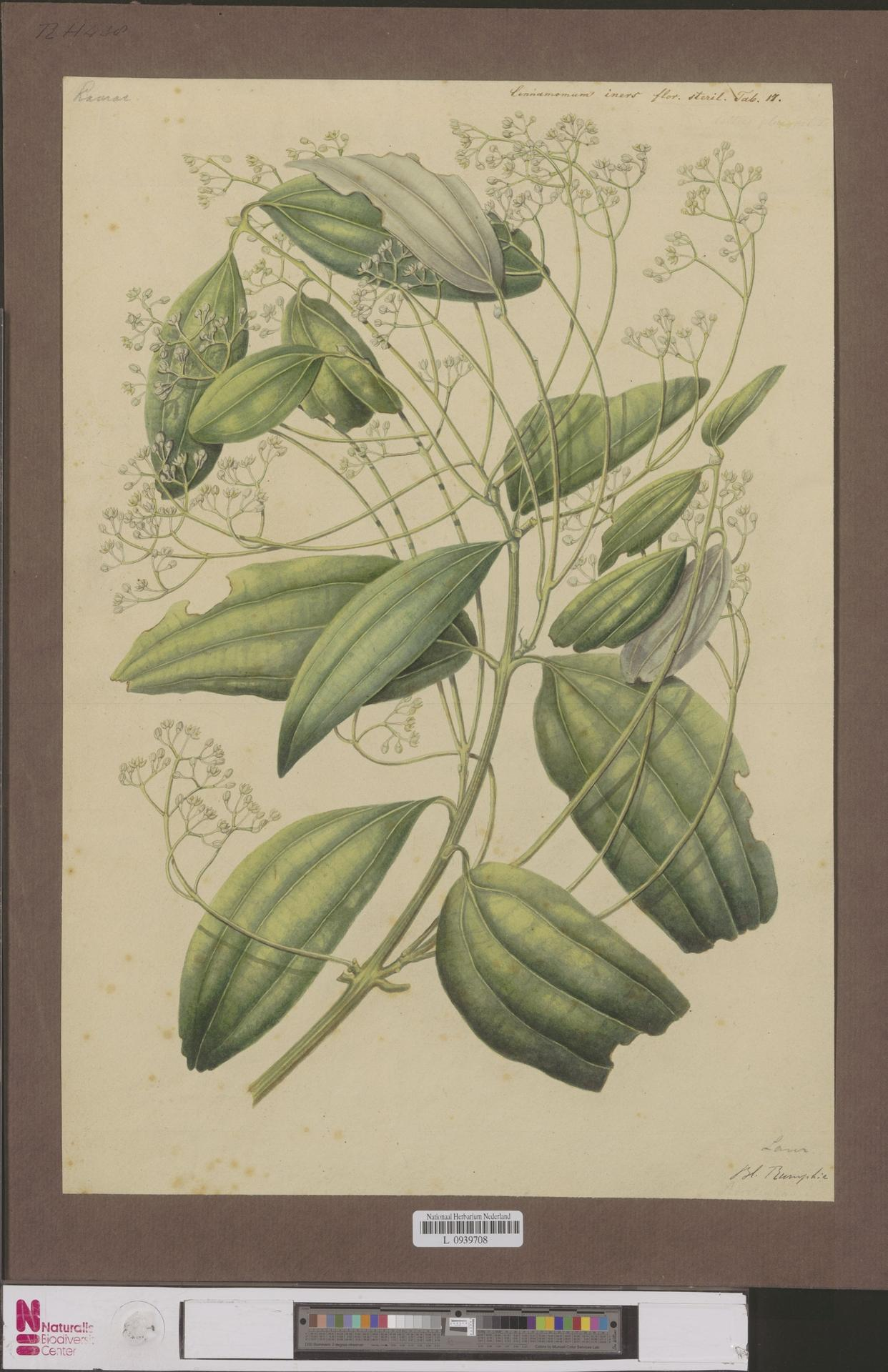
Drawing of C. iners by J.C.P. Arckenhausen, ~1835

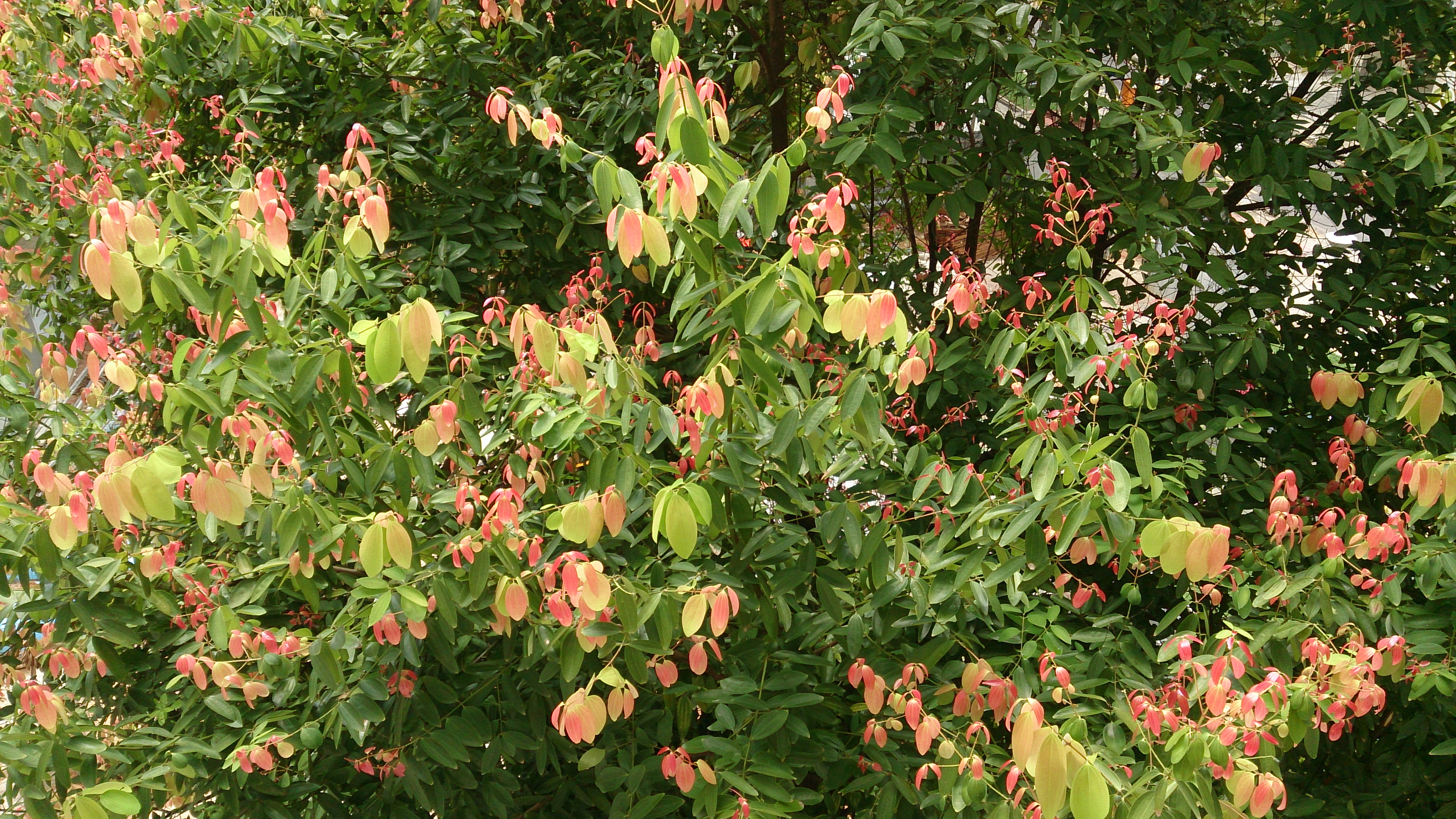

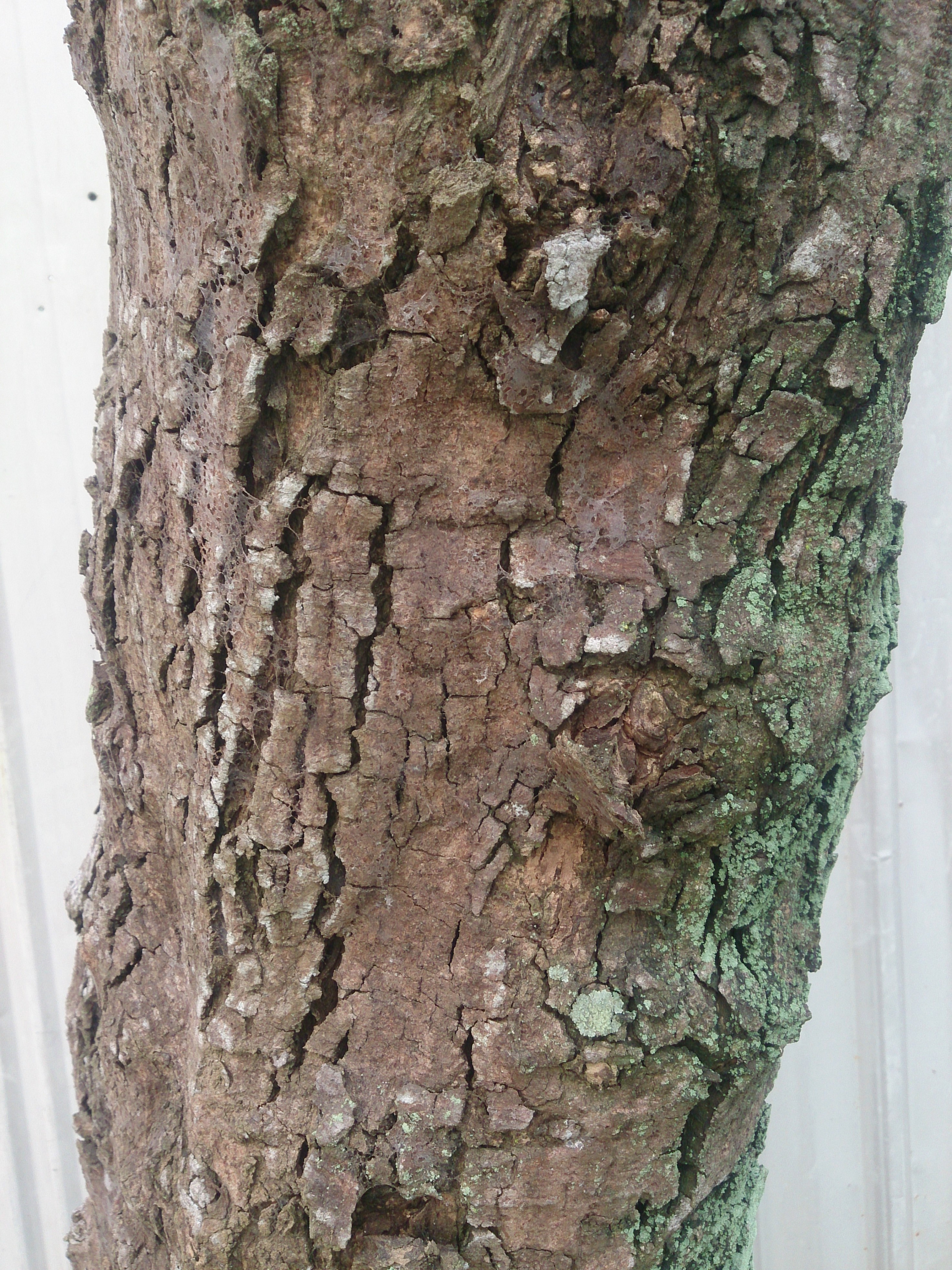
