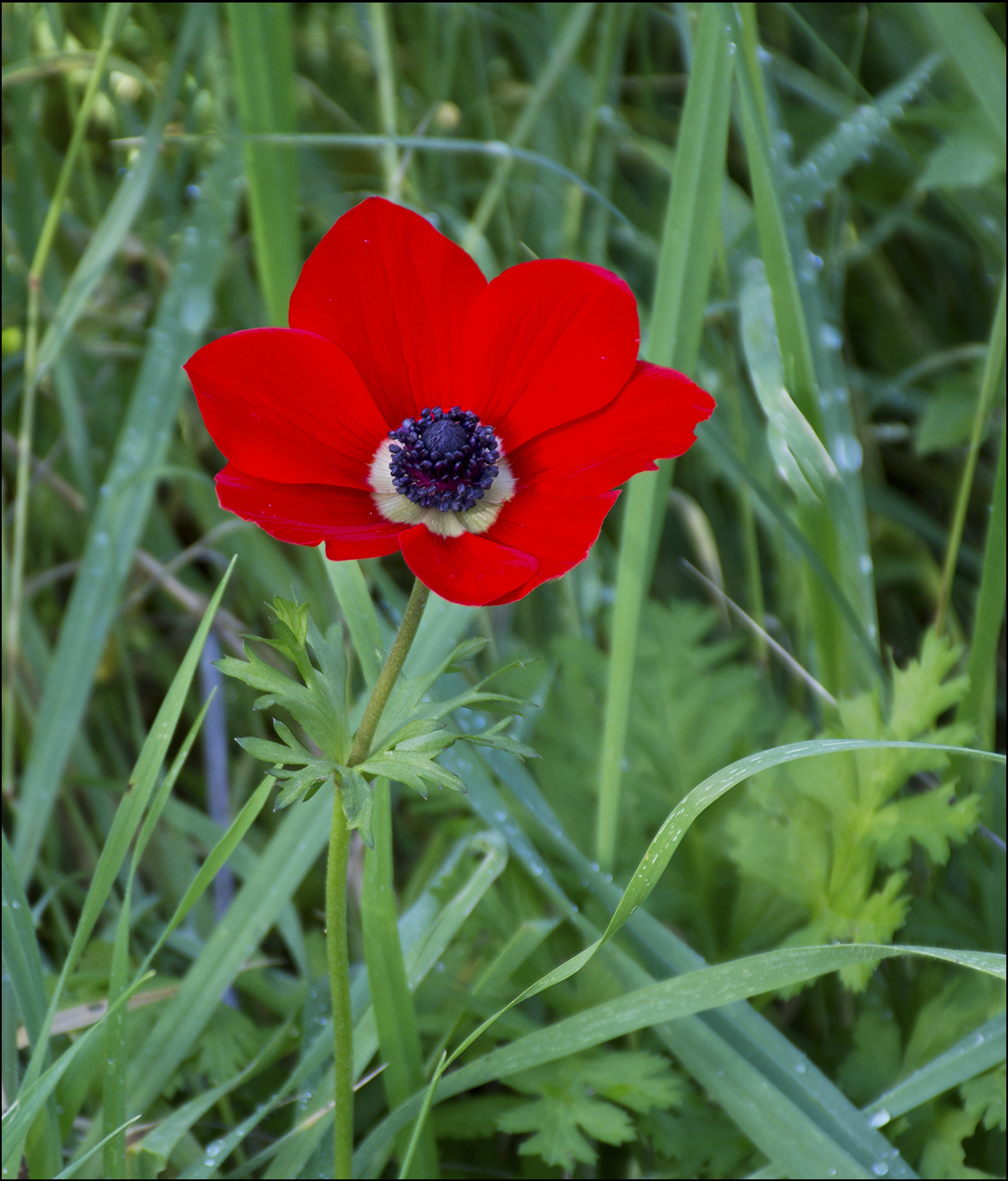

Scientific classification
- Kingdom: Plantae
- Clade: Tracheophytes
- Clade: Angiosperms
- Clade: Eudicots
- Order: Ranunculales
- Family: Ranunculaceae
- Genus: Anemone
- Species: A. coronaria

Binomial name
- Anemone coronaria L.

= Anemone coronaria =

Species of flowering plant in the buttercup family

Anemone coronaria, the poppy anemone, or garden anemone, is a species of flowering plant in the buttercup family Ranunculaceae, native to the Mediterranean region.

== Description ==
Anemone coronaria is a herbaceous perennial tuberous plant growing to 20–40 cm (7.9–15.7 in) tall, rarely to 60 cm (24 in), spreading to 15–23 cm (5.9–9.1 in), with a basal rosette of a few leaves, the leaves with three leaflets, each leaflet deeply lobed. The flowers which bloom from April to June are borne singly on a tall stem with a whorl of small leaves just below the flower; the flower is 3–8 cm in diameter, with 5–8 red (but may be white or blue) showy petal-like tepals and a black centre. The pollen is dry, has an unsculpted exine, is less than 40µm in diameter, and is usually deposited within 1.5 m of its source. This central mound consists of tightly packed pistils in the centre, with a crown-like ring of stamens surrounding this, giving the species its specific epithet coronaria. The flowers produce 200–300 seeds. The plants form hard black tubers as storage organs.

Aside from its flowers resembling poppies, the red single wild form flowers resemble the flowers of the red single wild form of Ranunculus asiaticus. Although widely called the 'poppy anemone' and sometimes rendered simply 'poppy' in English translations of Arabic sources, A. coronaria is an anemone (Ranunculaceae), not a poppy (Papaveraceae); the corn poppy it resembles is Papaver rhoeas, called khashkhash in Arabic.

== Etymology ==
Anemone coronaria means crown anemone, referring to the central crown of the flower. The genus name Anemone and the English "windflower" are conventionally derived from the Greek ánemos ("wind"), the etymology reflected in the common name for some species in the genus. The binomial was established by Linnaeus in Species Plantarum (1753), making it the most recent of the plant's names.

In Hebrew, the anemone is kalanit metzuya: kalanit comes from Hebrew כלה kala which means "bride", "metzuya" means "common". The kalanit earned its name because of its beauty and majesty, evoking a bride on her wedding day. In Israel, after the rainfall, the Negev Desert is blanketed in red due to the plethora of Anemone coronaria, while wild flowers in the northern part of the country, such as the Galilee, sport a variety of other colours.

One proposed source of the name traces back to the Mesopotamian shepherd-god, Tammuz, (Sumerian Dumuzid), a deity of fertility and vegetation, whose Phoenician epithet was "Nea'man". Tammuz is generally considered to have been drawn into the Greek pantheon as Adonis, who died of his wounds while hunting wild boar. The deity is transformed into a flower, stained by the blood of Adonis. Tammuz's Phoenician epithet "Nea'man" argued by Philip Hitti to be both the source of the Arabic "an-Nu'man" (النُعمان) which came through Syriac, and of "anemone" which came through Greek.

Another possible source of the name is An-Nu'man III Bin Al-Munthir, the last Lakhmid king of Al-Hirah (582–c.602 AD) and a Nestorian Christian. According to legend, the flower thrived on An-Nu'man's grave, after his death. He was deposed and put to death on the orders of the Sasanian king Khosrow II, c. 602, paralleling the death and rebirth of Adonis.

In Standard Arabic the flower is šaqā'iq an-nuʿmān (شَقائِق النُعْمان). The literal sense of šaqā'iq is debated: it is the plural of šaqīqa ("full sister"), so the phrase is often read as "the siblings/kin of Nu'man", while the common "wounds of Nu'man" reading is a poetic gloss drawing on nuʿmān as a pre-Islamic word for "blood" or "red".

== Taxonomy ==
Anemone coronaria is the type species of the genus Anemone. Within the genus Anemone, A. coronaria is therefore placed in the autonymic subgenus Anemone, section Anemone, subsection Anemone, and is one of five species making up series Anemone, together with Anemone hortensis L., Anemone palmata L., Anemone pavonina Lam. and Anemone somaliensis Hepper. Within the series A. coronaria is sister to A. somaliensis. This series is a clade of Mediterranean tuberous anemones.

== Distribution and habitat ==
Mediterranean littoral, from Greece, Albania, southern Turkey, Syria, Iraq, Northern Arabia to the Sinai Peninsula with sporadic extension east to Iran and west along the Mediterranean shores of Italy, southern France and North Africa.

Although they have been nurtured for two millennia, including early mention of cultivation by Pliny the Elder in ancient Rome, they still exist as well as wild flowers, particularly in Israel, southern Turkey, Syria, and Greece.

== Ecology ==
The flowers bloom in winter to early spring in the plant's native Mediterranean range (later, in spring, where grown in cooler climates). It is cross pollinated by bees, flies and beetles, which can carry pollen over long distances. Certain colours of A. coronaria attract one insect over another; both honey bees and mining bees are attracted to both white and purplish blue, while flies prefer only white. Scarab beetles show an overwhelming preference for red A. coronaria, which is also pollinated by other insects, such as honeybees.

Anemone coronaria was introduced into England prior to 1596, being described in John Gerard's Herball, first published in 1597 and was popular during the time of Queen Elizabeth I; Thomas Johnson's enlarged and corrected edition appeared in 1633. By the beginning of the eighteenth century, breeders in France and Italy had already considerably improved the range of colours available.

Anemone coronaria is widely grown for its decorative flowers, and has a hardiness of USDA zones 7–10, preferring full sun to part shade. Although perennial in its native climate, A. coronaria is usually grown as an annual in cooler climates, from tubers. Planting is usually in the autumn if kept in pots in a greenhouse through the winter or in the ground in spring once the risk of frost has passed.

=== Cultivars ===
Modern cultivars have very large flowers, with diameters of 8–10 cm (3.1–3.9 in) and a wide range of bright and pastel colours, in addition to two toned varieties. The centre is usually black, but may be pale green in white varieties. The stems may be as tall as 40–50 cm (16–20 in), and each plant may produce 13–15 blooms.

Numerous cultivars have been selected and named, the most popular including the De Caen (single) and St Brigid (semi-double and double) groups of cultivars. The De Caen group are hybrids cultivated in the districts of Caen and Bayeux in France in the 18th century, and include 'Bicolor' (red with white), 'Blue Poppy' (blue), 'Mr Fokker' (purple), 'Sylphide' (deep pink) and 'The Bride' (white). Referred to as poppy anemones because they superficially resemble the true poppy (Papaver). St. Brigid cultivars originated in Ireland, and named after that country's saint, they include 'Lord Lieutenant' (purple blue) and 'The Governor' (red). In addition to these large groups, there are two minor groups, Rissoana which is very rustic and early blooming (November) and Grassensis with large double flowers that bloom in the spring.

== Symbolism ==
=== Greek ===
The Adonis myth tells of how the goddess Aphrodite is the lover of a handsome youth, Adonis. When the latter is gored by a wild boar, Aphrodite rushes to help him. Finding him lifeless, she transforms him by turning his blood into the red anemone. This amorous and calamitous significance also exists on the island of Cyprus and has earned the plant its presence in various European art forms.

=== English ===
In remembrance of the Adonis myth, red anemones are known as Adonis flowers.

=== Christian ===
The flowers have traditionally been associated with the term "lily of the field" used in the Christian Beatitudes. Matthew 6 compares lilies of the field to Solomon, stating that they effortlessly trump even the great king in terms of splendid garb.

Mention of a solitary, brilliant red anemone which made its journey from the Holy Land to Pisa in the twelfth century during the Second Crusade exists. Its luminousness was attributed to the flower's absorption of Christian blood spilled in the soil of the Holy Land during battle, but can practically be explained by the fact that Anemones in Israel (Anemone coronaria) are more dazzling than their counterpart in Italy (Anemone pavonina).

=== Renaissance ===
Wealthy gardeners prized flowers from exotic lands, and showcased them in their gardens. Botanical pursuits were lauded. Anemones were one of the flowers most showcased during this era, both in Italy and further north in Europe, i.e. Austria, Belgium, and Holland. Hence the flower came to symbolize affluence.

=== Levant ===
==== Palestine ====
The flower is a cultural symbol to Palestinians who often allude to it in their poems, like that of Ibrahim Nasrallah.

==== Israel ====
It is also adopted by the Israeli side appropriated as a symbol of returning (aliyah) and hebraization. In 2013 Anemone coronaria was elected as the national flower of the State of Israel, in a poll arranged by the Society for the Protection of Nature in Israel (החברה להגנת הטבע) and Ynet. Each year in Israel there is a month-long festival to celebrate the blooming of the red anemones. In addition to admiring the flowers, the event includes guided nature and history excursions in the area, cooking and painting classes, herb, spice, vegetable, and fruit markets, and entertainment such as musical performances. In 2016, Shoshana Damari performed her iconic song "Kalaniyot", a tribute to red anemones.

After 7 October 2023 after the killing of Israelis and foreign nationals by Hamas, the festival went on hiatus, or at least changed; in February 2024, the festival was cancelled, but The International Christian Embassy in Jerusalem, together with the KKL-JNF, pledged to plant 1,200 memorial trees in the area, dedicated to the 1,200 victims of 7 October. Meanwhile, the blooms offered a sense of life's renewal, resilience, and strength after so much anguish. In January 2025, it was temporarily renamed "Darom B'Lev" (The South in our Hearts), as opposed to "Darom Adom" (The Red South). At this point, the event focused on supporting families whose loved ones were being held hostage in Gaza. In February 2026, after all hostages, both dead and alive, were secured from Gaza, the festival returned, but under its changed 2024 name. Picnic baskets were sold, workshops returned, and even horseback riding and hot air balloon rides were offered, giving a sense of rejuvenation to the region.

Art

The flower was the subject of Israeli art way prior to 7 October, a positive symbol of passion and the emotion evoked by nature. Its strong colours were also indicative of the harmony inherent in cooperative dwellings. But sometimes the colour evoked a sense of foreboding, due to its association with the "Red Alert" warning when there were threats in the area. After 7 October, it has been used profusely in Israeli art, symbolizing both loss and hope, as in the exhibit "Anemones before the Rain", depicting both a water cascade and 5,000 clay anemones, homemade by Israeli volunteers throughout the country.

== Gallery ==
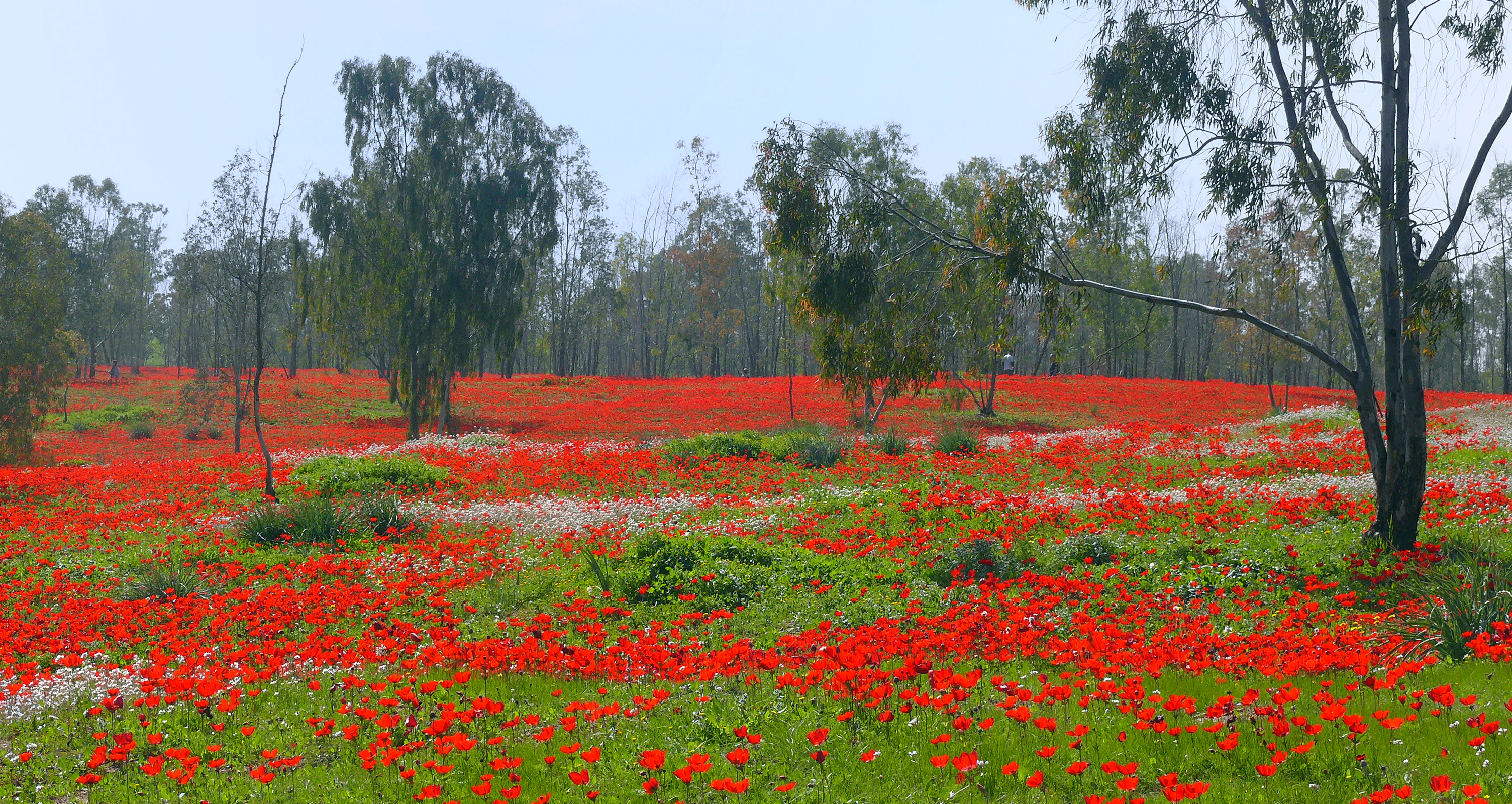
Red carpet of flowers in Shokeda Forest, Israel, 2012

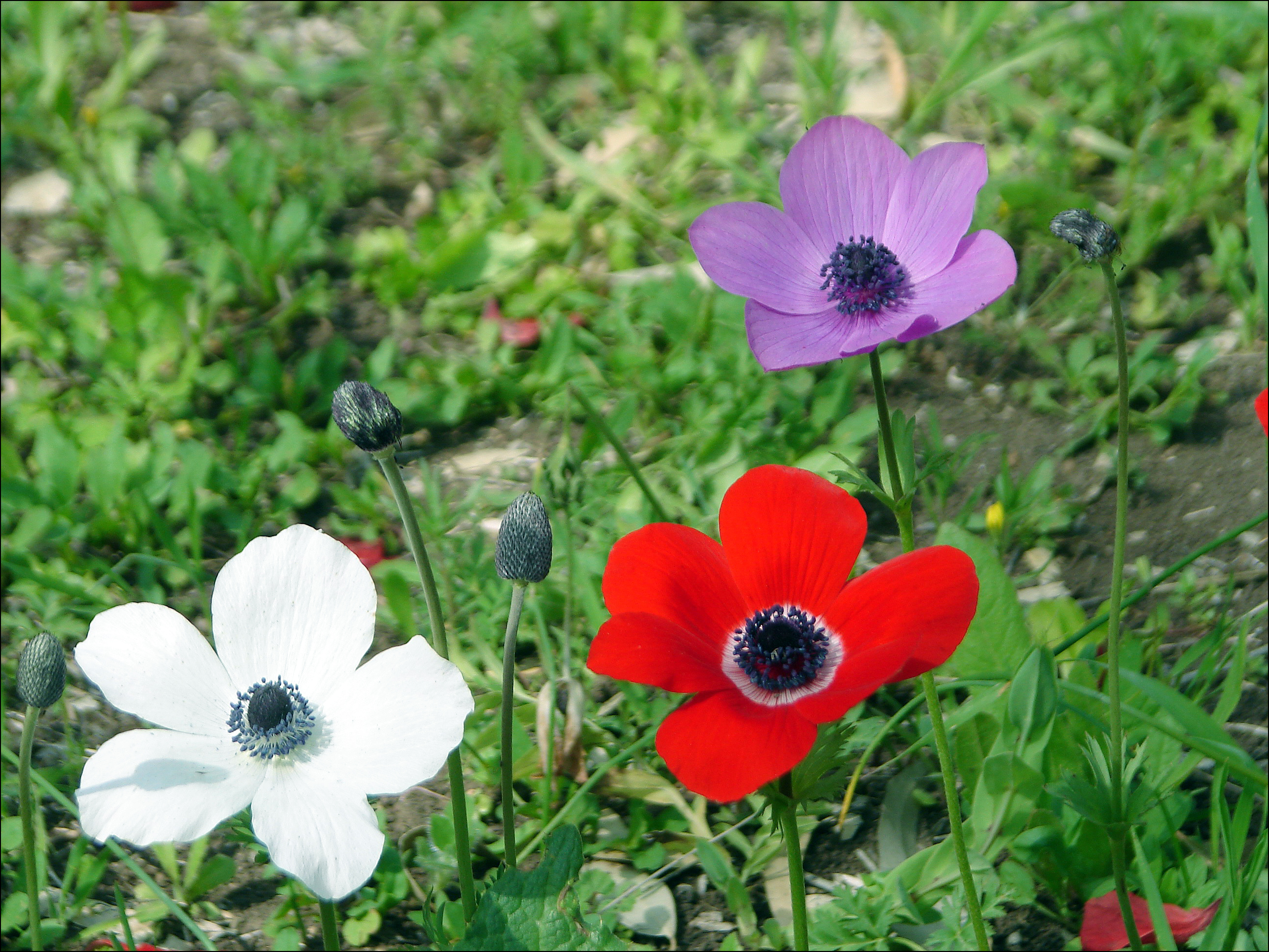
Growing wild near Megiddo, Israel

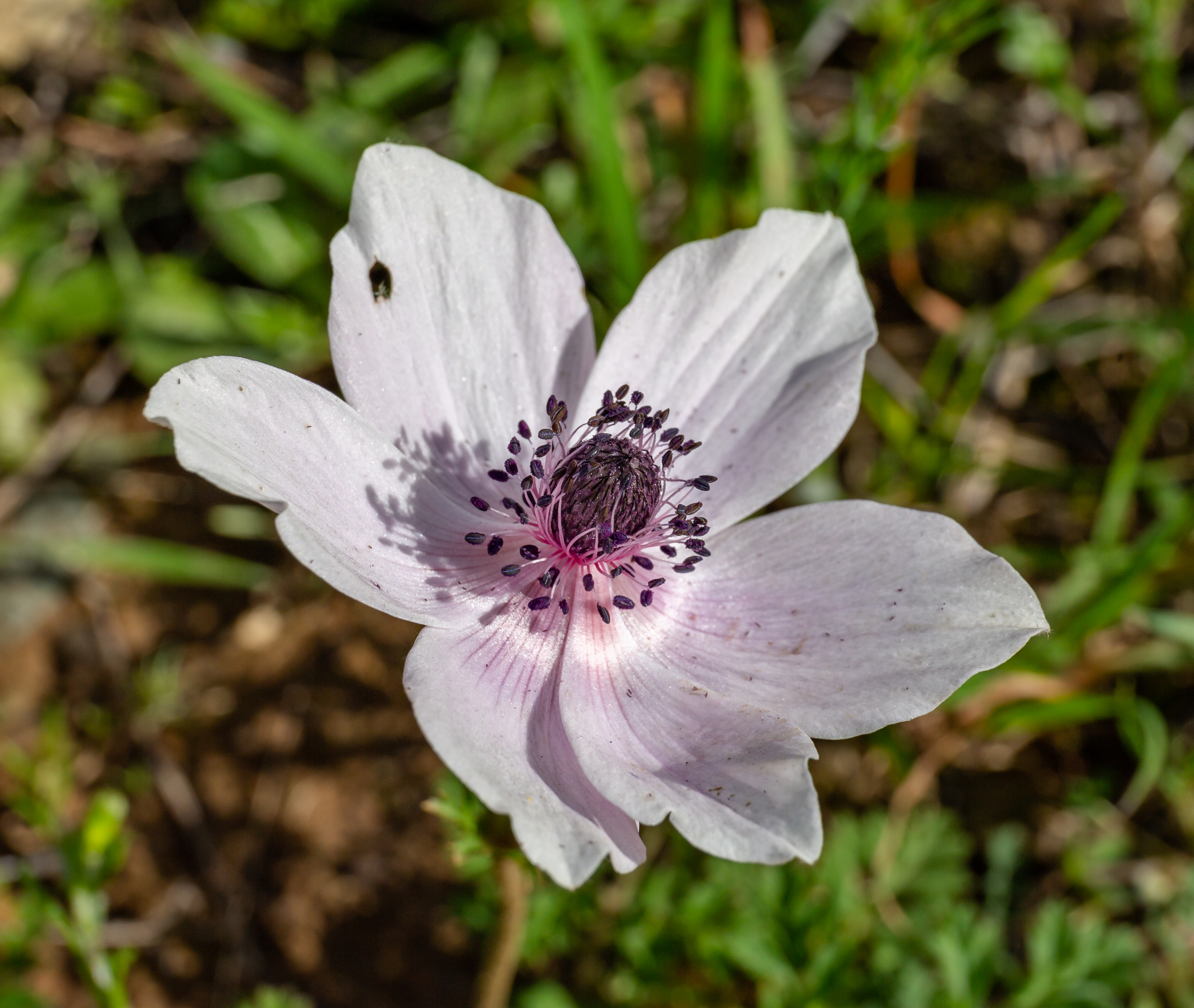
In Cyprus

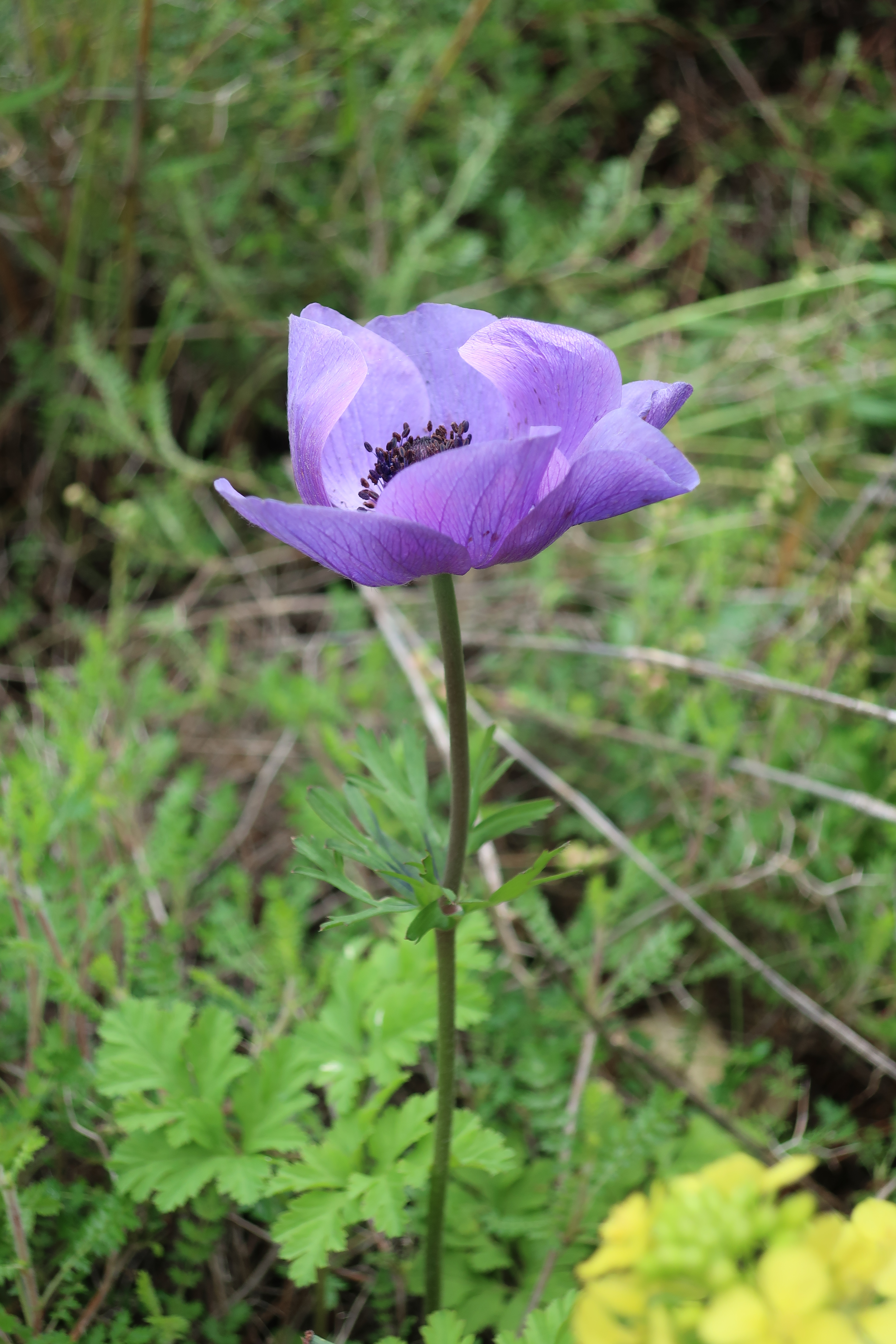
Purple anemone in the Judean mountains

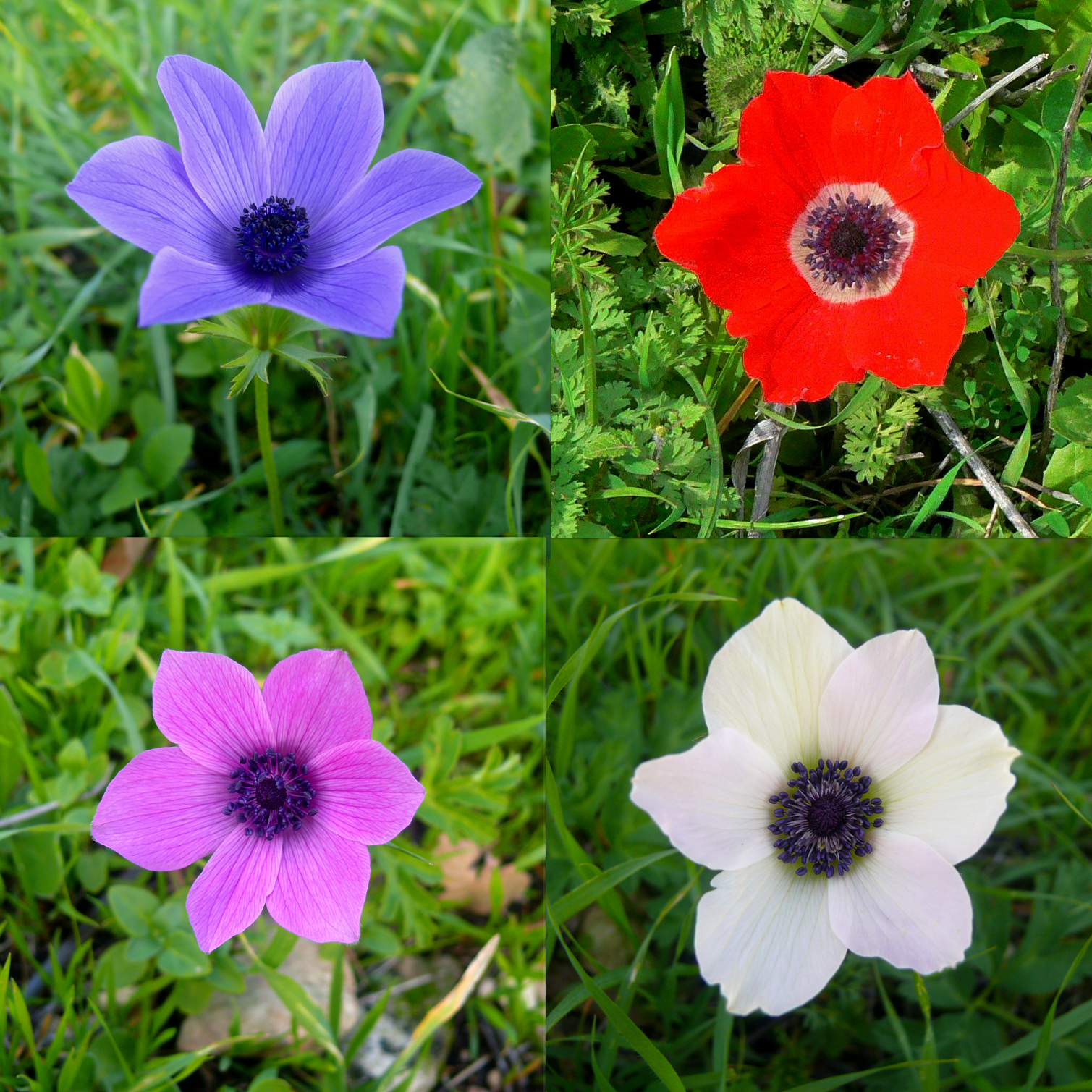
Flowers of various colours

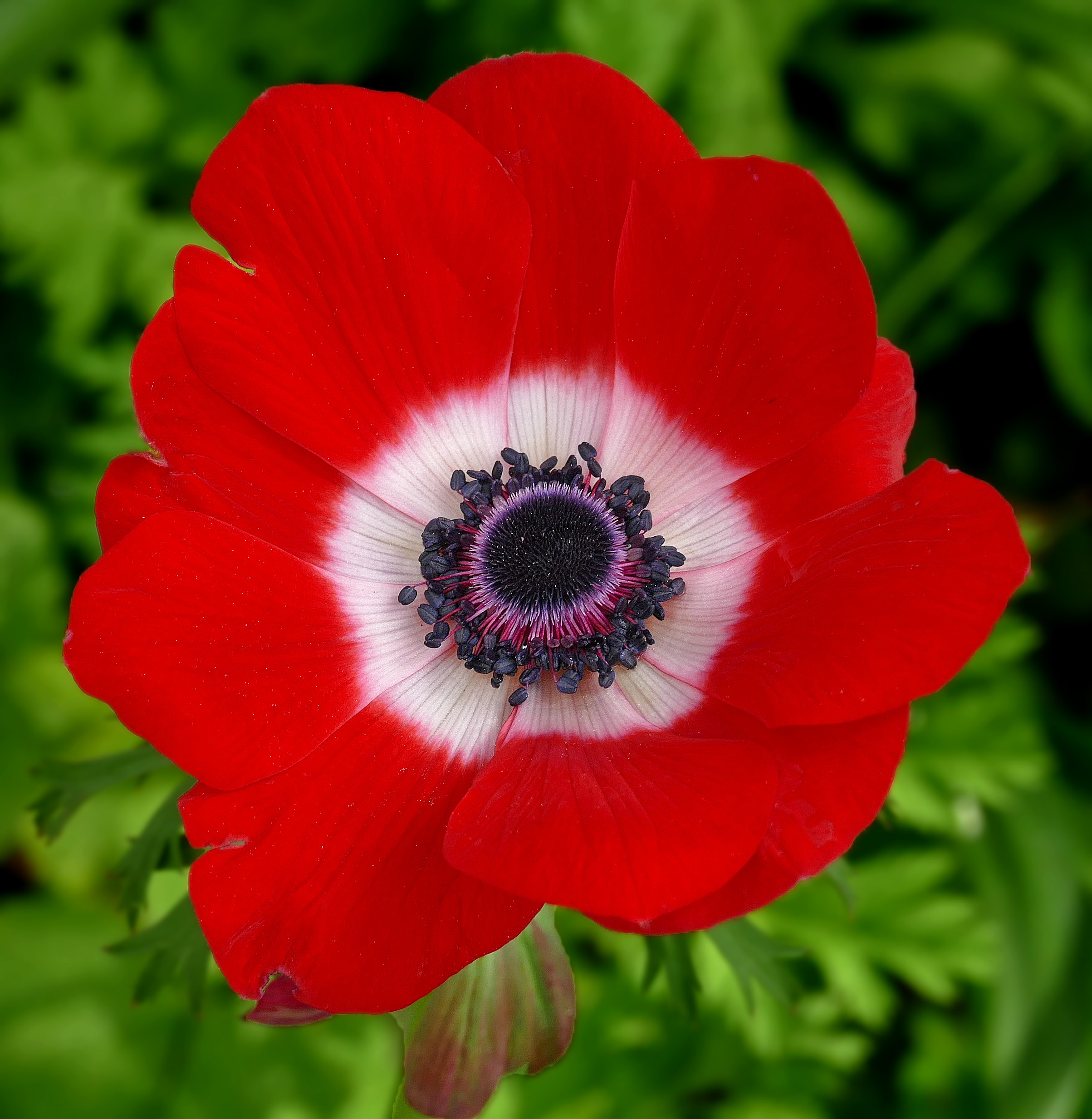
Red flower

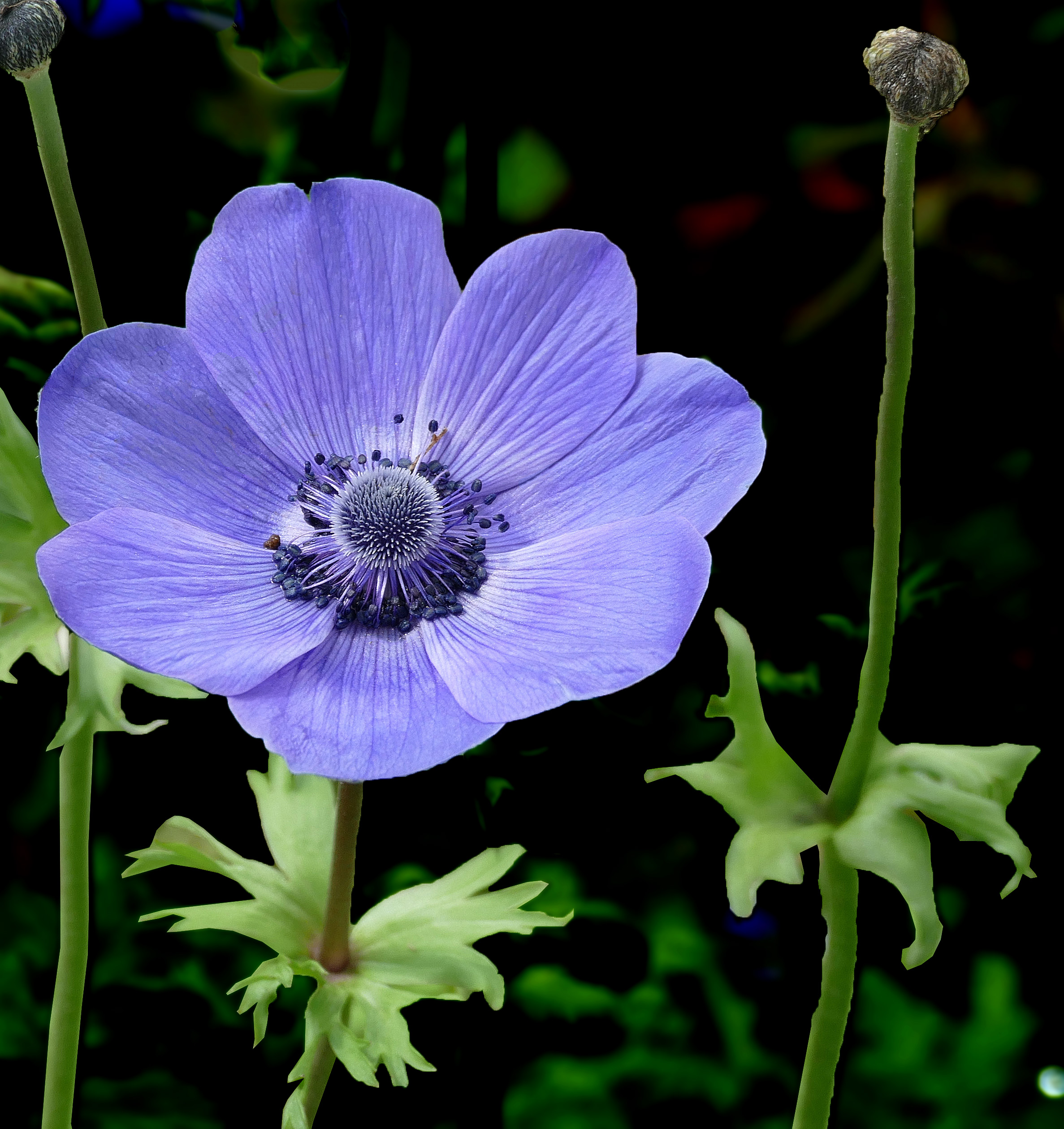
Blue flower

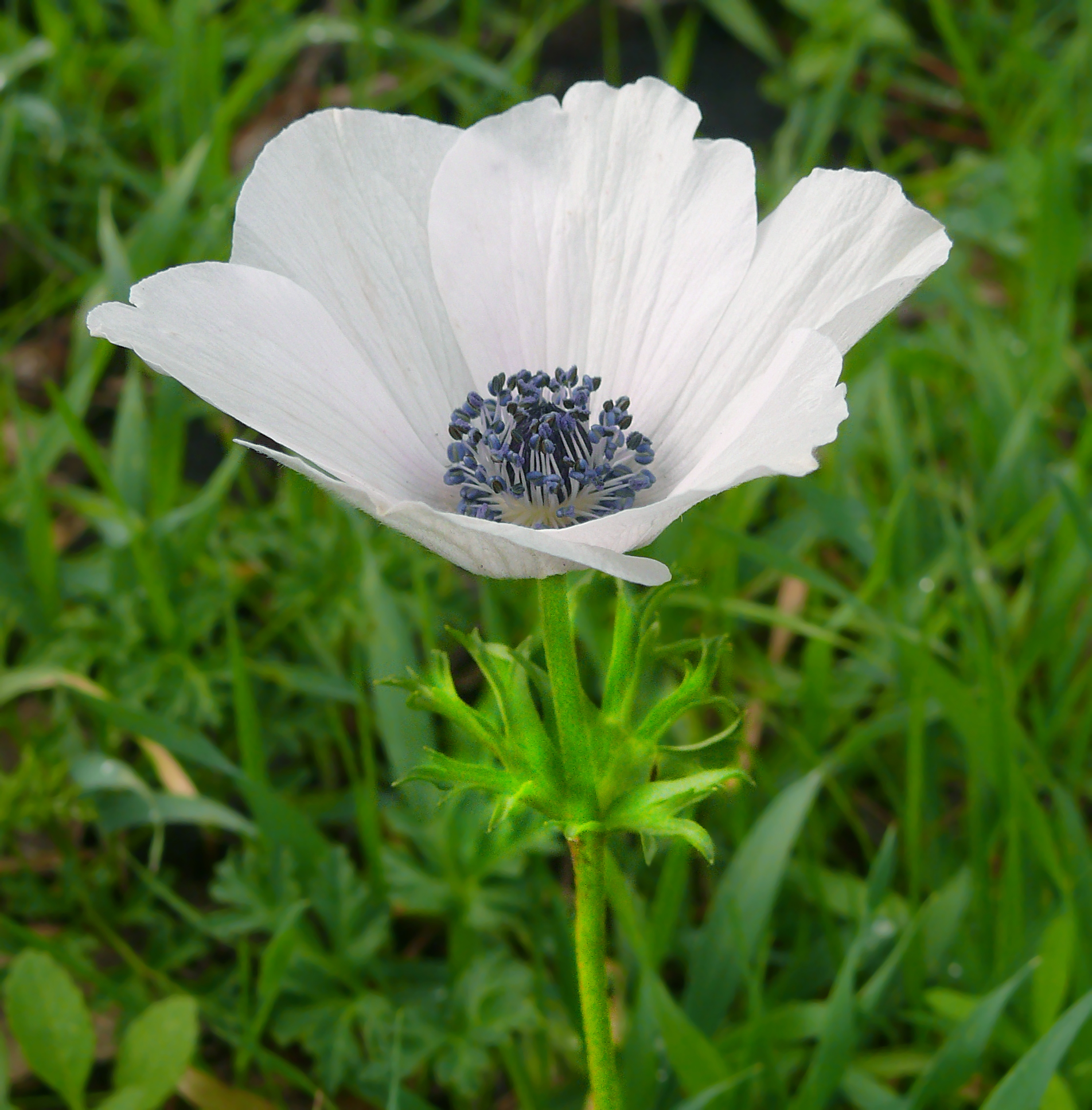
White flower

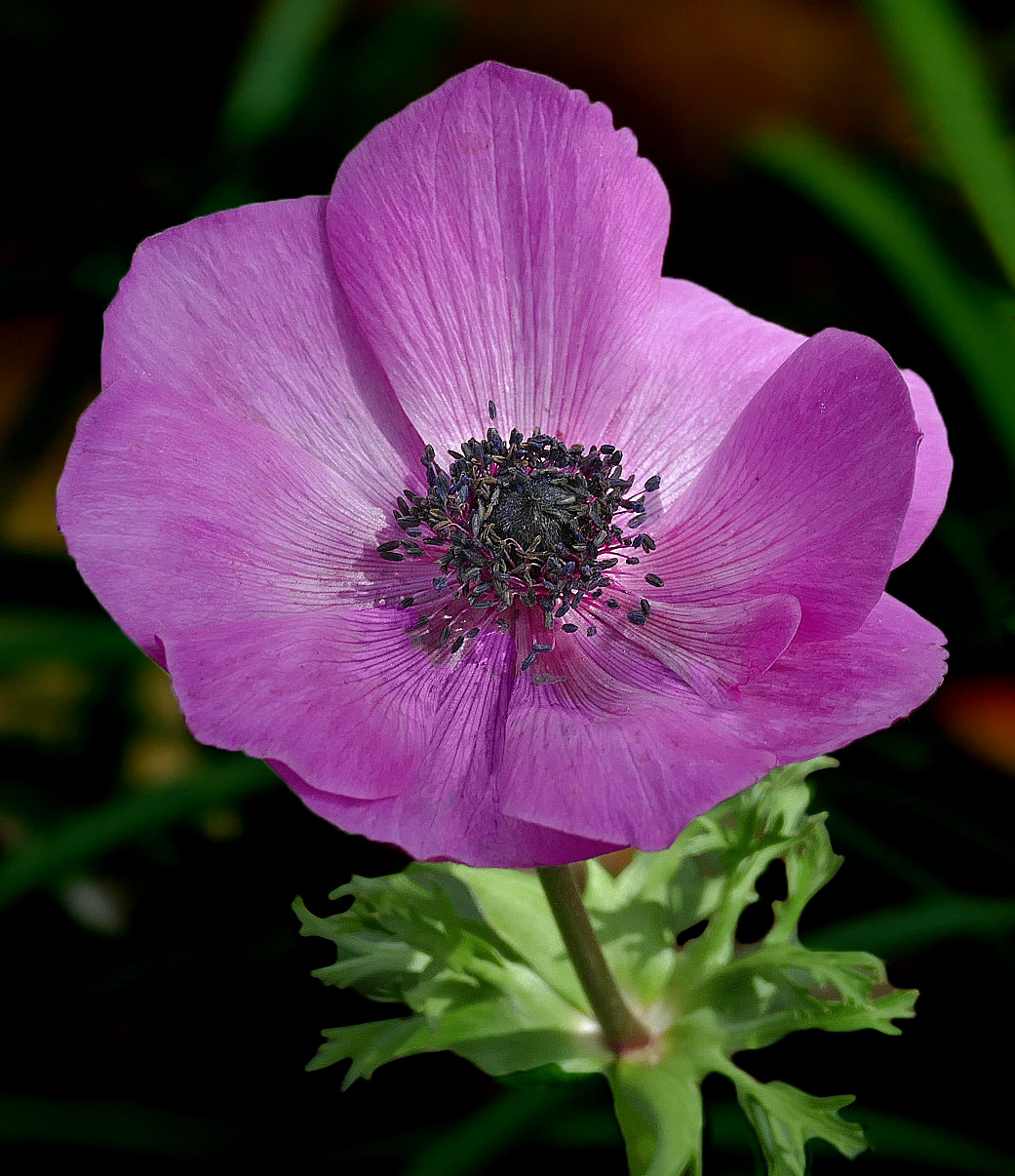
Purple flower

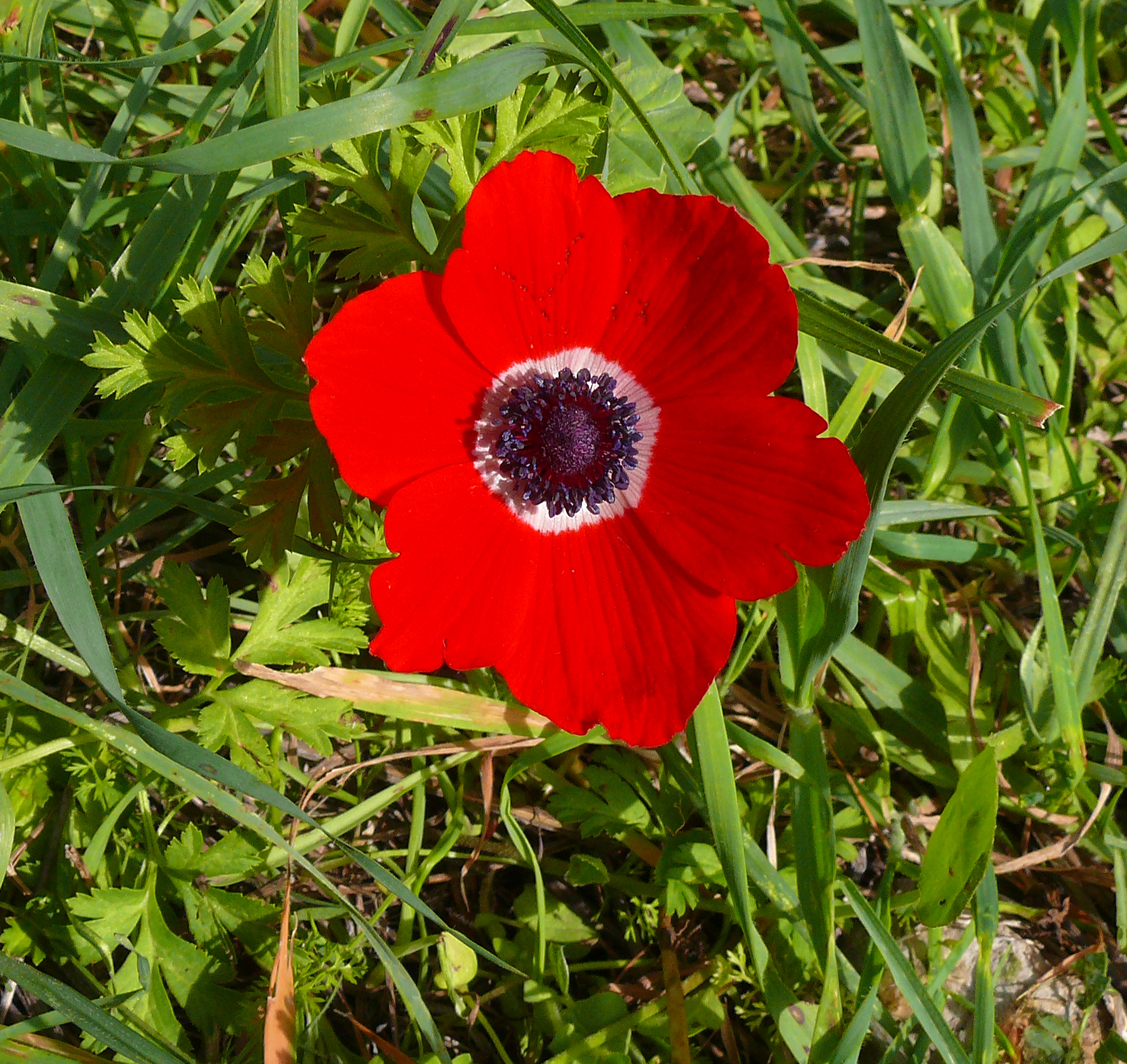
Red flower with 6 petals

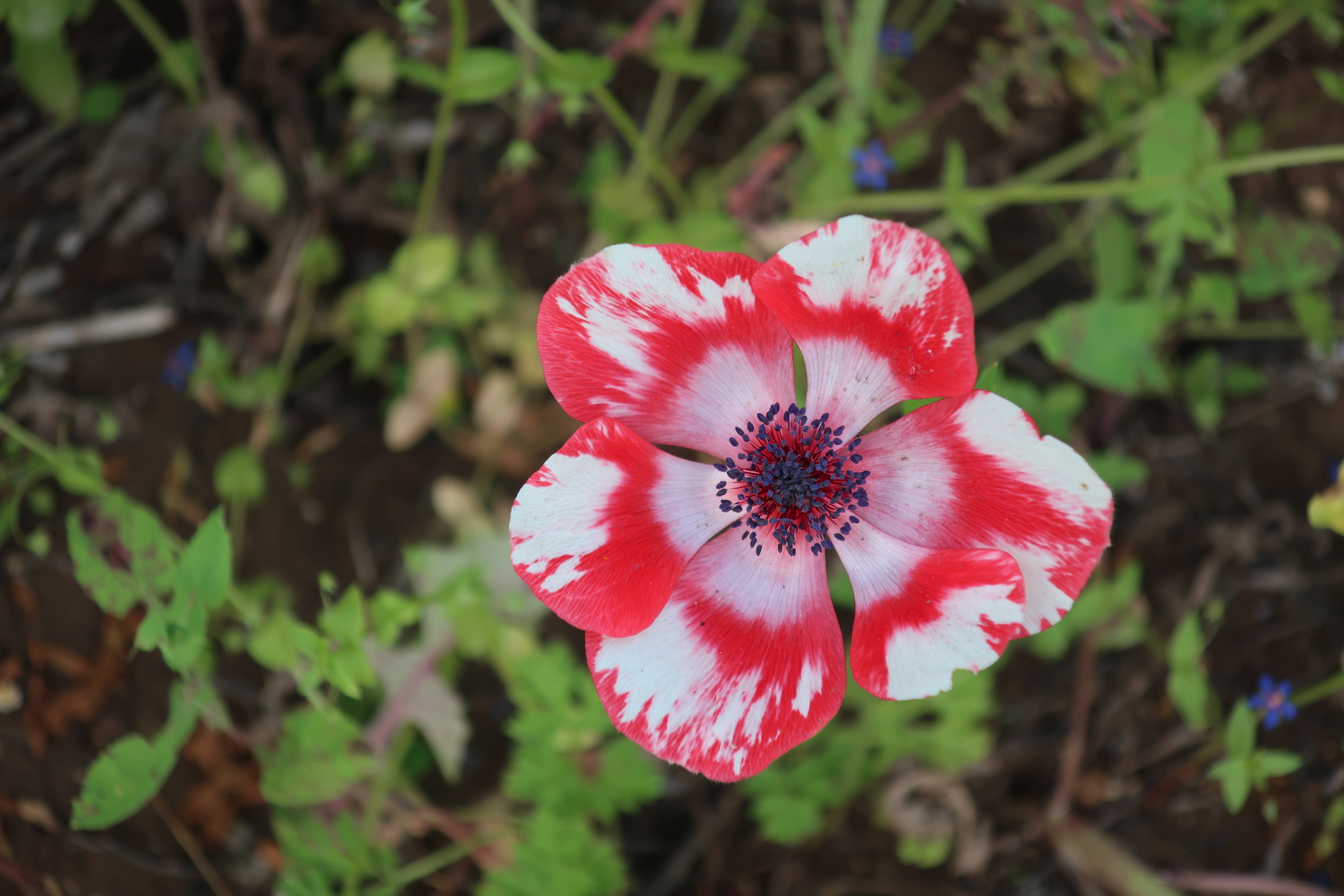
Red and white anemone

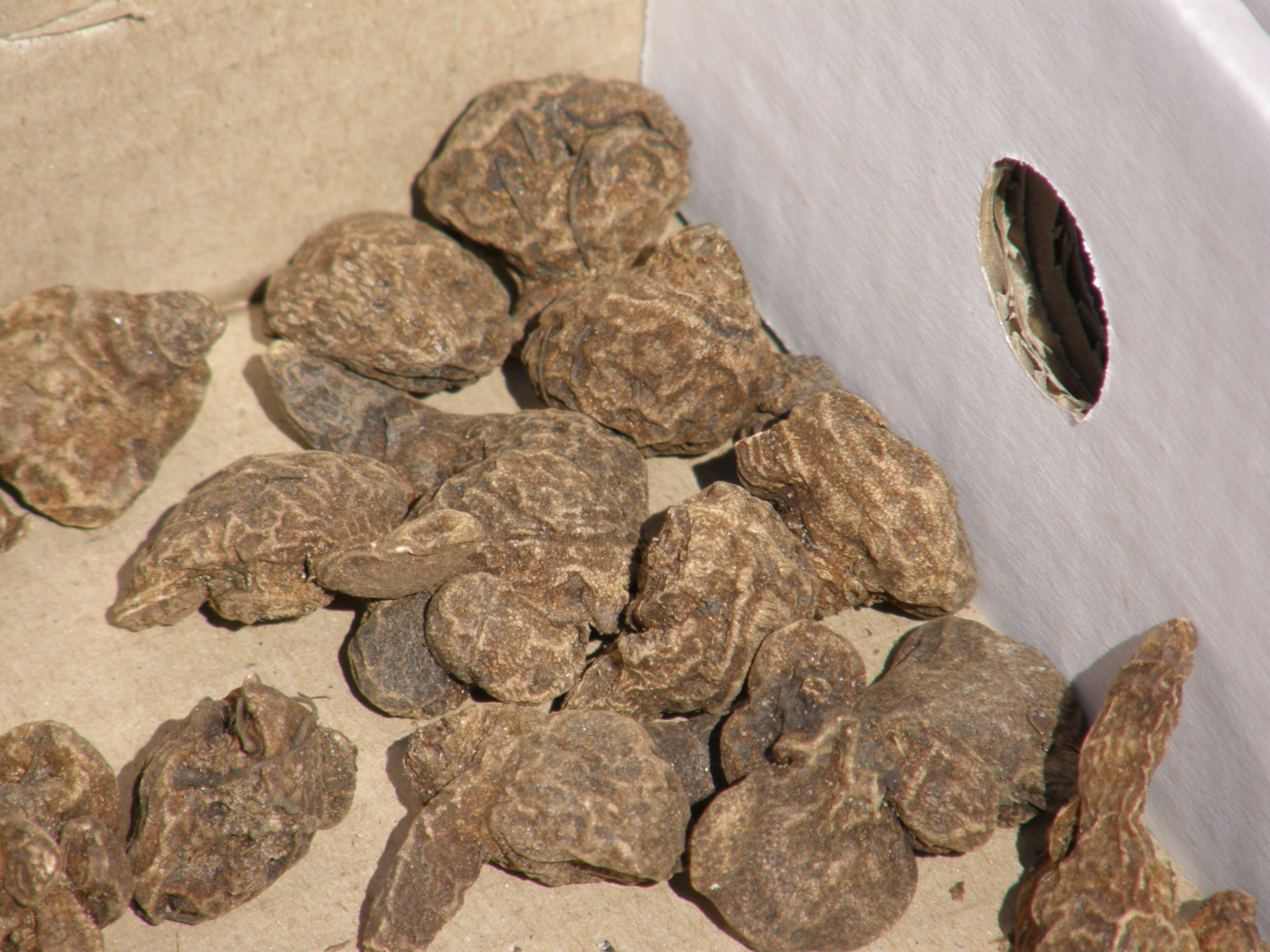
Tubers

Pink Anemone with tuber, Megiddo Airfield, Israel

Purple Anemone with tuber, Megiddo Airfield, Israel

== Bibliography ==
- Hoot, Sara B.; Meyer, Kyle M.; Manning, John C. (1 March 2012). "Phylogeny and Reclassification of Anemone (Ranunculaceae), with an Emphasis on Austral Species". Systematic Botany. 37 (1): 139–152. doi:10.1600/036364412X616729. S2CID 85773478.
- Laura, M.; Allavena, A. (1 January 2007). "Anemone coronaria Breeding: Current Status and Perspectives" (PDF). European Journal of Horticultural Science. 72 (6): 241–247. doi:10.1079/ejhs.2007/491527. JSTOR 24126221. Archived from the original (PDF) on 18 April 2017.
- Johnston, Brian (May 2008). "A Close-up View of the "Anemone": Anemone coronaria (De Caen Group)". Microscopy UK.
- "Anemone coronaria". Gardening help: Plant finder. Missouri Botanical Garden.
- "List of accepted plant names" (Excel). Resources. BSBI. 2007.
- "Anemone coronaria (poppy anemone)". Gardenia. 2017.
- "Anemone coronaria 'De Caen Group'". Gardener's World. BBC. 2017. Archived from the original on 24 February 2018.
