= Alles mit Gott und nichts ohn' ihn, BWV 1127 =

Strophic aria by Johann Sebastian Bach

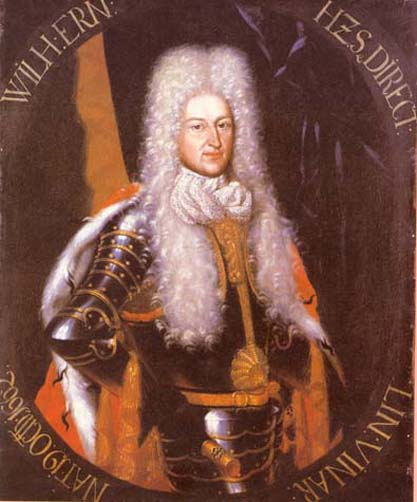
Duke Wilhelm Ernst of Saxe-Weimar, dedicatee of "Alles mit Gott und nichts ohn' ihn", BWV 1127

"Alles mit Gott und nichts ohn' ihn" (Everything with God and nothing without him), BWV 1127, is Johann Sebastian Bach's October 1713 setting of a poem in 12 stanzas by Johann Anton Mylius, Superintendent of Buttstädt, a town in the Duchy of Saxe-Weimar. The poem is an acrostic dedicated to Duke Wilhelm Ernst of Saxe-Weimar, on his birthday (30 October). Bach, at the time employed as court organist by the Duke, set Mylius's ode as an aria in strophic form, that is a melody for soprano accompanied by continuo for the stanzas, alternated with a ritornello for strings and continuo. When all stanzas are sung, a performance of the work takes around 45 to 50 minutes.

The work was likely first performed on the Duke's birthday. The original print of Mylius's poem, with Bach's composition written on two pages at the end, was archived in Weimar, where it remained unnoticed for nearly three centuries, accidentally twice escaping a devastating fire, in 1774 and in 2004, until it was rediscovered in May 2005. After the discovery (in 1924) and publication (in 1935) of Bekennen will ich seinen Namen, BWV 200, this was the first time an autograph of a previously unknown vocal work by Bach had come to light.

== Context ==
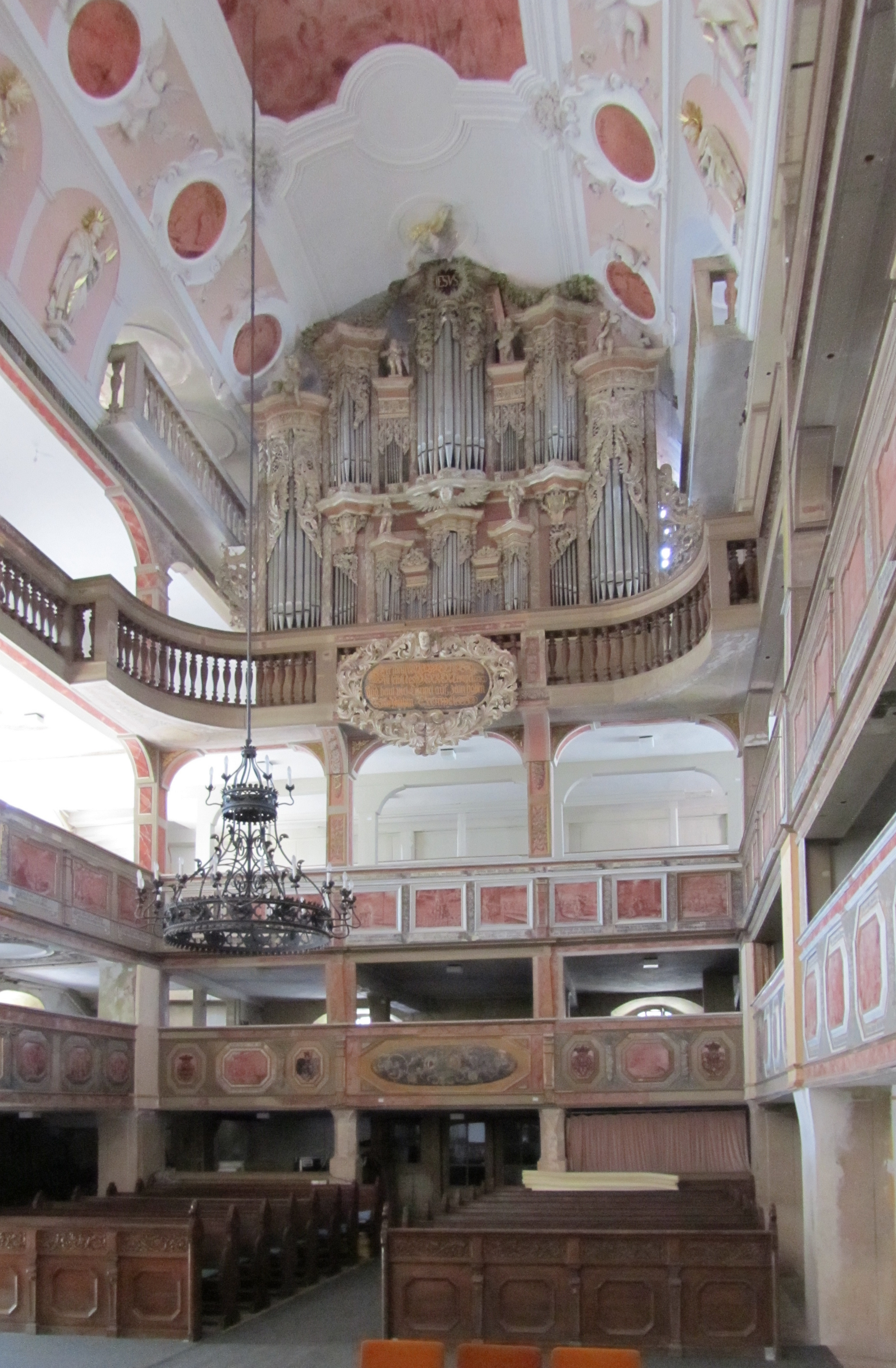
Johann Anton Mylius initiated a renovation of St Michael's Church in Büttstadt, including its organ (loft pictured). A plaque on the parapet in front of the organ commemorates Duke Wilhelm Ernst's support to these endeavours, reading, "Der theure Wilhelm Ernst ist selbst des Herren Tempel und baut viel Tempel auf zum hohen Ruhm Exempel" (The beloved Wilhelm Ernst is himself a temple of the Lord, and erects many temples as an example of high honour).

Wilhelm Ernst was born on (O.S.) 19 October 1662. In 1683 he became Duke of Saxe-Weimar, jointly with his younger brother Johann Ernst. The elder brother had chosen Omnia cum Deo et nihil sine eo (everything with God and nothing without him) as his motto. In 1700, when the Gregorian calendar was adopted, Wilhelm Ernst decided that his birthday would henceforth be celebrated on 30 October. In 1703 Johann Sebastian Bach worked for some months at the ducal court in Weimar. In 1708, a year after the death of the younger duke, Bach came to work for the ducal court again, this time in the capacity of organist.

At the time, Johann Samuel Drese and his son Johann Wilhelm were the court composers (Hofkapellmeister) at Weimar, and composition of new pieces was no part of Bach's assignment as court organist. In 1713 Bach composed the Hunting Cantata (Was mir behagt, ist nur die muntre Jagd, BWV 208, first performed on 27 February in Weißenfels) and the Canon a 4 perpetuus, BWV 1073 (2 August). Also from around this time are several entries in the Orgelbüchlein, and likely the bulk of his Weimar concerto transcriptions.

Johann Anton Mylius's life is relatively well-documented: in 1751–52 one of his sons published an extended chronicle of the Mylius family, and the family was later also subject to detailed historical research. After studies in Erfurt and Leipzig in the 1680s, Johann Anton became a theologian working in Erfurt and Niederroßla, and, having become Superintendent in 1674, he was from 1697 stationed in Buttstädt, a town some 20 kilometres (12 mi) north of Weimar. There, he initiated reforms of the liturgical music, and grand renovation works to the town church (St Michael's), including its organ. Duke Wilhelm Ernst supported Mylius in these endeavours, and even organised a fund-raiser in his realm to finance the renovation works.

Every year Duke Wilhelm Ernst would typically receive over a dozen of written congratulatory tributes. The copies of these tributes which were presented to the Duke were mostly bound in luxurious marbled paper, and conserved in the court library. One of these, published by Mumbachische Schrifften, was by the court preacher Johann Kless, and congratulated the duke on his 52nd [sic] birthday on 30 October 1713 (that date was in fact the Duke's 51st birthday). Mylius and Bach convened to produce a tribute for the same occasion. The title page of that tribute, also printed by Mumbachische Schrifften, reads in part:

| den XXX. Octobr. MDCCXIII. ... des | on 30 October 1713. ... the |
| ... | ... |
| Hochfürstl. Geburths-Tage | birthday of the sovereign, |
| und gesegnetem Antritt Dero 53sten Lebens-Jahres | and blessed start of the 53rd year of his life |

The title page of Mylius's ode contains the same miscalculation of the Duke's age, which, according to Michael Maul, would not be down to any of the individual authors using the services of the Mumbachische Schrifften publishing house, but was likely a more widespread misapprehension. Several composers could have been Mylius's choice for this collaboration: there were not only father and son Drese, but also the musicians with whom he collaborated in Büttstadt – whatsoever, the one with whom he embarked on the project was the 28-year old Bach. The theme of Mylius's congratulatory poem is the Duke's motto, announced thus on the tribute's title page:

| Unsers gnädigst-regierenden Landes-Fürsten | Our benevolent sovereign's |
| und Herrns | and lord's |
| Christ-Fürstlicher Wahl-Spruch | christian-princely motto |
| Oder | or |
| SYMBOLUM, | creed: |
| Omnia cum DEO, & nihil sine eo. | Omnia cum Deo et nihil sine eo. |
| Alles mit GOTT und nichts ohn Ihn. | Everything with God and nothing without him. |

Notwithstanding that the occasion, a birthday, was of a secular nature—usually Bach composed secular odes or cantatas for such occasions—, the result was a sacred work, not in the least because of the religious nature of the motto that became the topic of Mylius's exegetic poem. Bach set it as a strophic aria, a genre that had been widely practised in Germany by the end of the 17th century, but was considered old-fashioned by the second decade of the 18th century. In 1713, Duke Wilhelm Ernst's birthday was officially celebrated on Sunday 5 November, a day before he consecrated the newly finished St Jacob's Church. It is unlikely that "Alles mit Gott und nichts ohn' ihn", BWV 1127, was first performed on either of these days, a weekday service in the court chapel on Monday 30 October, the Duke's actual birthday, seeming more likely for that first performance.

== Music and lyrics ==
The printed text of Mylius's ode takes five pages in the dedication copy, while Bach's handwritten setting, titled "Aria Soprano Solo è Ritornello" (aria for solo soprano and ritornello), takes the last two pages of the pamphlet.

=== Mylius's ode ===
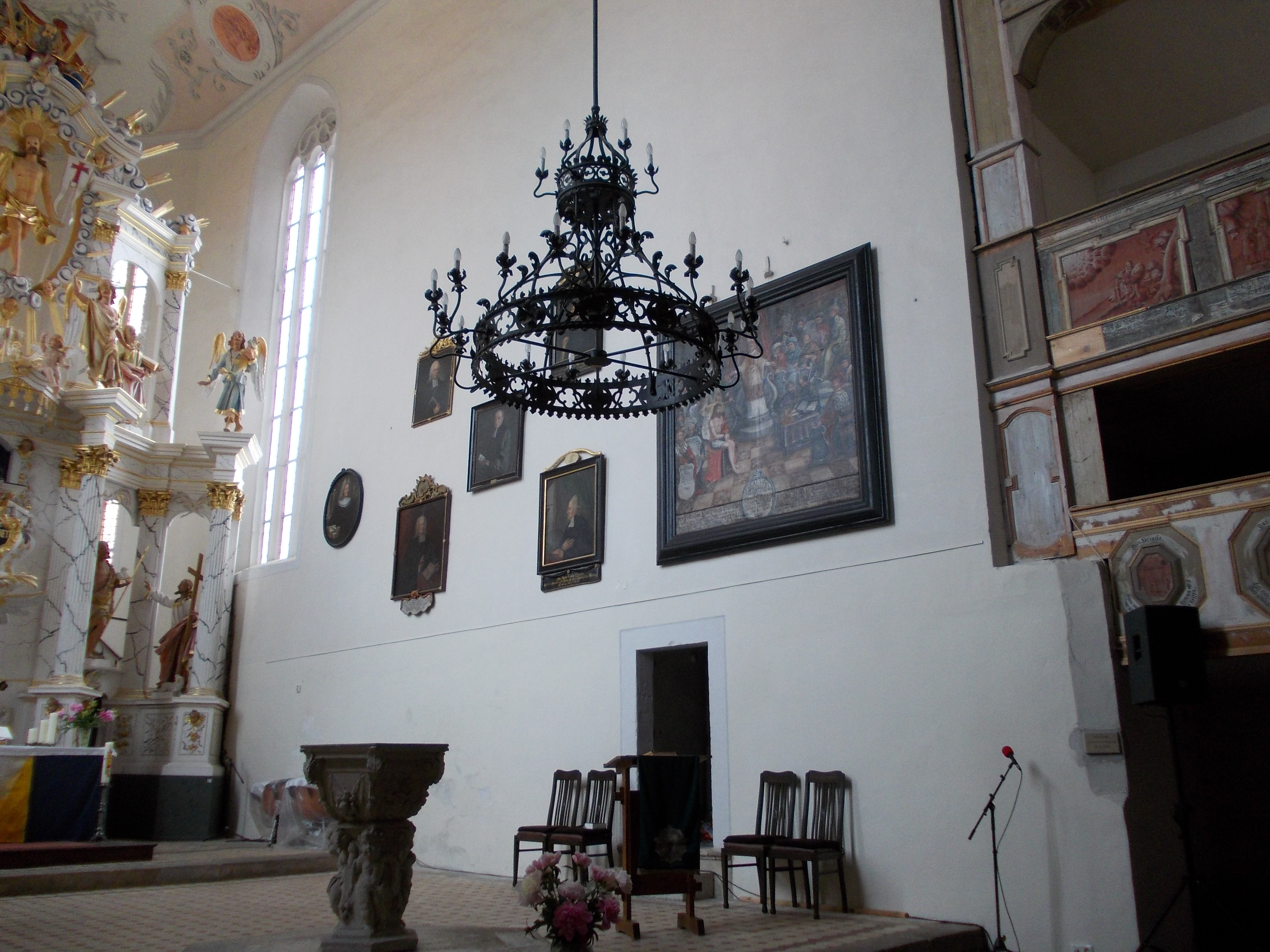
St Michael's Church in Büttstadt: the leftmost portrait on the right wall is that of Johann Anton Mylius.

Mylius's poem is an acrostic in 12 stanzas of eight lines. The motto of Duke Wilhelm Ernst, in Latin and German, is given as the title of the poem on the page that holds its first stanza in the 1713 print. The first and last line of each stanza is the German version of the Duke's motto. In a footnote to the first line of the first stanza, Mylius gives these biblical references for the sovereign's motto (Symb. regium):

- Psalm 18:30, "For by thee I have run through a troop; and by my God have I leaped over a wall."
- Psalm 60:14, "Through God we shall do valiantly: for he it is that shall tread down our enemies."
- 1 Chronicles 30:14, 16, "But who am I, and what is my people, that we should be able to offer so willingly after this sort? for all things come of thee, and of thine own have we given thee. ... O LORD our God, all this store that we have prepared to build thee an house for thine holy name cometh of thine hand, and is all thine own."

The second line of the first stanza reads:

Wird Ein-Her Wunder-Seegen Ziehn

— Mylius 1713 (original emphasis)
Translation:

Will draw wondrous blessings here

— translation

To which Mylius adds this footnote:

Continent litteræ initiales ut & mediales illustrissimum nomen serenissimi Regentis nostri.

— Mylius 1713
Translation:

The initial letters, as well as those in the middle of the line, contain the most famous name of our most noble ruler.

— Henrike Lähnemann (2026)

The footnote indicates the scheme of the acrostic:

- The emphasized letters (W, E, H, W, S, and Z) are the initials of the Duke's name, i.e. Wilhelm Ernst Herzog Zu Sachsen-Weimar (Wilhelm Ernst Duke of Saxe-Weimar).
- The third word, Wunder (wondrous), starts with the same letter as Wilhelm Ernst's name. The second line of each stanza starts with Wird Ein-Her and ends on Seegen Ziehn: the word between these two half-phrases, Wunder in the case of the first stanza, reads for the 12 consecutive stanzas:
  1. ... Wunder ... (... wondrous ...)
  2. ... Jesus ... (... Jesus' ...)
  3. ... Landes ... (... country's ...)
  4. ... Himmels ... (... heaven's ...)
  5. ... Edlen ... (... noble ...)
  6. ... Lebens ... (... life's ...)
  7. ... Manchen ... (... many ...)
  8. ... Ewgen ... (... eternal ...)
  9. ... Reichen ... (... rich ...)
  10. ... Neuen ... (... new ...)
  11. ... Seelen ... (... soul's ...)
  12. ... Tausend ... (... thousand ...)

The initials of these words read "WJLHELM ERNST" – that is the Duke's name.

The acrostic technique was very common in such congratulatory poetry, and the Duke apparently appreciated it. The seventh line of each stanza is a variant of its second line, starting with Soll ... (Must ...) instead of Wird ... (Will ...). The four middle lines of each stanza are an exegetic explanation of its second line, and Mylius indicates in footnotes which Bible passages support his theological interpretation. By stanza these biblical references for the four middle lines are,

1. ... Wunderseegen ... (wondrous blessings):
  - Psalm 72:18, "Blessed be the LORD God, the God of Israel, who only doeth wondrous things."
  - Genesis 15:1, "After these things the word of the Lord came unto Abram in a vision, saying, Fear not, Abram: I am thy shield, and thy exceeding great reward."
  - Job 14:1, "Man that is born of a woman is of few days and full of trouble."
2. ... Jesus Seegen ... (Jesus' blessing):
  - Luke 5:3ff, "And [Jesus] entered into one of the ships, which was Simon's, and prayed him that he would thrust out a little from the land. And he sat down, and taught the people out of the ship."
3. ... Landesseegen ... (blessings for the country):
  - Sirach 10:5, "In the hand of God is the prosperity of man: and upon the person of the scribe shall he lay his honour."
  - Deuteronomy 33:13, "And of Joseph he said, Blessed of the LORD be his land, for the precious things of heaven, for the dew, and for the deep that coucheth beneath"
4. ... Himmelsseegen ... (blessings from heaven):
  - Hosea 2:21, "And it shall come to pass in that day, I will hear, saith the LORD, I will hear the heavens, and they shall hear the earth"
  - Jeremiah 5:24, "Neither say they in their heart, Let us now fear the LORD our God, that giveth rain, both the former and the latter, in his season: he reserveth unto us the appointed weeks of the harvest."
  - Psalm 85:11, "Mercy and truth are met together; righteousness and peace have kissed each other."
5. ... edlen Seegen ... (noble blessings):
  - Deuteronomy 33:13, "And of Joseph he said, Blessed of the LORD be his land, for the precious things of heaven, for the dew, and for the deep that coucheth beneath"
6. ... Lebens Seegen ... (life's blessings):
  - Psalm 133:4, "for there the LORD commanded the blessing, even life for evermore."
  - Kohelet 1:8, "All things are full of labour; man cannot utter it: the eye is not satisfied with seeing, nor the ear filled with hearing."
7. ... manchen Seegen ... (many blessings):
  - Psalm 139:1, "O lord, thou hast searched me, and known me."
8. ... ewgen Seegen ... (eternal blessings):
  - 2 Corinthians 4:17, "For our light affliction, which is but for a moment, worketh for us a far more exceeding and eternal weight of glory"
  - Romans 8:18, "For I reckon that the sufferings of this present time are not worthy to be compared with the glory which shall be revealed in us."
9. ... reichen Seegen ... (rich blessings):
  - Ephesians 3:20, "Now unto him that is able to do exceeding abundantly above all that we ask or think, according to the power that worketh in us"
10. ... neuen Seegen ... (new blessings):
  - Lamentations 3:23, "[The Lord's compassions] are new every morning: great is thy faithfulness."
  - Isaiah 40:31, "But they that wait upon the LORD shall renew their strength; they shall mount up with wings as eagles; they shall run, and not be weary; and they shall walk, and not faint."
  - Song of Songs 3:4, "It was but a little that I passed from them, but I found him whom my soul loveth: I held him, and would not let him go, until I had brought him into my mother's house, and into the chamber of her that conceived me."
11. ... Seelenseegen ... (blessings for the soul):
  - Wisdom 3:3, "And their going from us to be utter destruction: but they are in peace."
  - Matthew 10:28, "And fear not them which kill the body, but are not able to kill the soul: but rather fear him which is able to destroy both soul and body in hell."
  - John 11:26, "And whosoever liveth and believeth in me shall never die. Believest thou this?"
  - Matthew 16:26, "For what is a man profited, if he shall gain the whole world, and lose his own soul? or what shall a man give in exchange for his soul?"
12. ... tausend Seegen ... (thousand blessings):
  - Daniel 7:10, "A fiery stream issued and came forth from before him: thousand thousands ministered unto him, and ten thousand times ten thousand stood before him: the judgment was set, and the books were opened."
  - Revelation 7:9, "After this I beheld, and, lo, a great multitude, which no man could number, of all nations, and kindreds, and people, and tongues, stood before the throne, and before the Lamb, clothed with white robes, and palms in their hands"
  - Psalm 143:11, "Quicken me, O LORD, for thy name's sake: for thy righteousness' sake bring my soul out of trouble."

=== Bach's setting ===
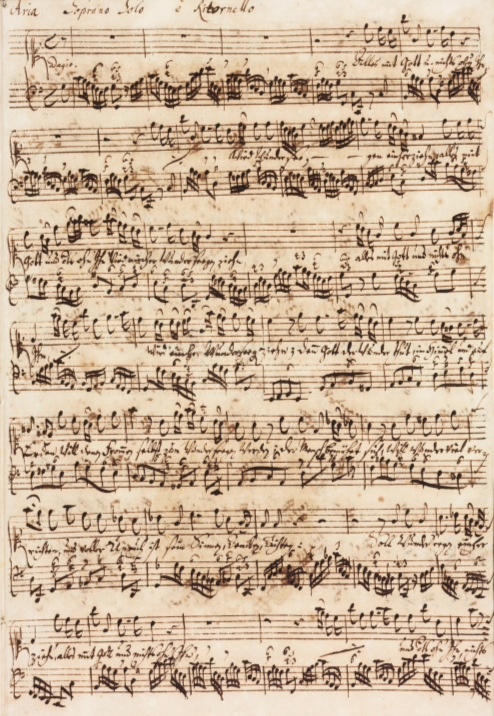
First page of Bach's autograph

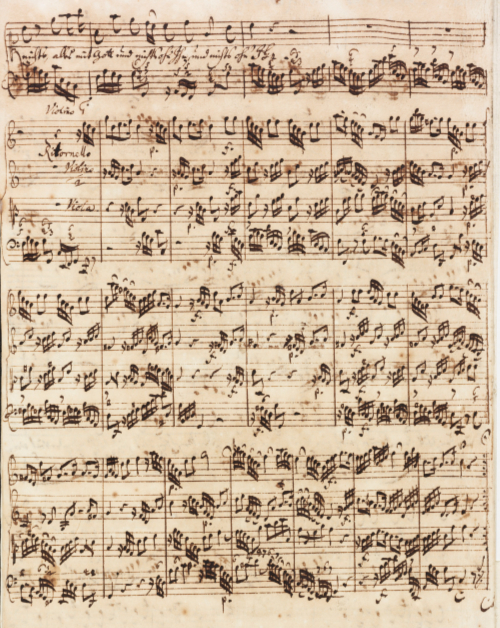
Second page of Bach's autograph

The title Bach gave to his setting, in C major, of Mylius's "Alles mit Gott und nichts ohn' ihn" indicates that the composition has two parts:

- Aria Soprano Solo – for soprano voice and figured bass (continuo)
- Ritornello – for two violins, viola, cello, and continuo

Bach's setting is in common time and its tempo indication is adagio. The setting is a strophic aria: the same music is repeated for each of the 12 stanzas of Mylius's poem. Bach's score only contains the text of the first stanza: a custos and a repeat sign at the end indicate that the other stanzas are to be performed to the same music. Since a single pass of Bach's music takes around four minutes to perform, the entire work is performed in around 45 to 50 minutes. If a split performance was intended (e.g. before and after a sermon), then the split would most likely fall after the seventh stanza: that is the stanza with which the "WJLHELM" part of the acrostic ends, and the exegetic middle lines of that stanza are of a concluding nature, like those of the very last stanza of the poem.

==== Aria ====
The aria part of Bach's composition starts with a four-bar instrumental introduction by the continuo: that introduction has exactly 52 bass notes, which may be seen as an allusion to the age of Duke Wilhelm Ernst. From the end of the fourth bar to the first note of the 17th bar the soprano sings the first two lines of Mylius's poem, that is the A section of its first stanza. On the first pass of the second line, Bach changed the word order: "wird Wundersegen einher ziehn" instead of "wird einher Wundersegen ziehn" in the poem. Maul describes Bach's setting of the A section as having "an artfully melismatic and 'catchy' tune"

The B section of the stanza, consisting of its middle four explanatory lines, is sung from bar 17 to 25. The setting of this section is harmonically more expansive than that of the A section. The mirrored A section, consisting of the two last lines of the stanza, follows from bar 26 to 34. The word order of the seventh line of the stanza, sung in bars 26 to 27, is changed as the first pass of the second line (bars 8–10): "soll Wundersegen einher ziehn" instead of "soll einher Wundersegen ziehn" in the poem. In these bars Bach returns from the subdominant (F major), at the end of the B section, to the tonic (C major), after which the "catchy tune" with which the A section opened is repeated to the same words (line 8 = line 1, the Duke's motto in all stanzas). In this way Bach realises a free da capo form, that is, instead of an exact repeat of the A section, a variant of the A section follows after the B section (A-B-A').

The voice and continuo part of the composition ends with a four-bar instrumental postlude, by the continuo, which keeps close to the four-bar introduction. Thus the build of the "aria" part of the composition is symmetrical:

- Introduction by continuo (four bars)
  - First line of the stanza: "motto" tune for the Duke's "motto"
    - Second line of the stanza, containing (before the word Seegen) the topic of the stanza
      - Four middle lines of the stanza: exegetic explanation on the topic of the stanza
    - Seventh line of the stanza, mirroring the second line
  - Eighth line of the stanza, mirroring the first line: same "motto" tune for the Duke's "motto"
- Postlude by continuo, mirroring the first four bars

Or, approached as a free da capo aria:

First stanza
| Section | Text | Translation |
|---|---|---|
| A | [instrumental introduction] | |
| A | Alles mit Gott und nichts ohn' ihn Wird einher Wunderseegen ziehn. | Everything with God and nothing without him Will draw wondrous blessings here. |
| B | Denn Gott, der Wunder tut im Himmel und auf Erden, Will denen Frommen, selbst, zum Wundersegen werden. Der Mensch bemühet sich, will Wunder viel verrichten, Und voller Unruh ist sein Sinnen, Denken, Dichten. | While God, who performs miracles in heaven and on earth, Wants to become a wondrous blessing to the pious. Man toils, and wants to realise many miracles, and his mind, thoughts, poetry, are full unrest. |
| A' | Soll einher Wunderseegen ziehn. Alles mit Gott und nichts ohn' ihn. | Must draw wondrous blessings here. Everything with God and nothing without him |
| A' | [instrumental postlude] | |

==== Ritornello ====
The Ritornello starts on the last beat of the 37th bar, continuing in the 18 remaining bars of the composition. It consists of two development sections (the second of these starting in the 45th bar), on the most prominent motifs of the aria section. Christoph Wolff describes the four-part instrumental ritornello as "written in a dense, motivic and contrapuntal texture reminiscent of the pieces in the contemporary Orgel-Büchlein." Maul elaborates an example of how motifs that have sounded on the words wird Wunderseegen einher ziehn and Alles mit Gott in the aria part are combined in the last six bars of the first development of the Ritornello, and then again in the last three bars of its second development.

== Reception ==
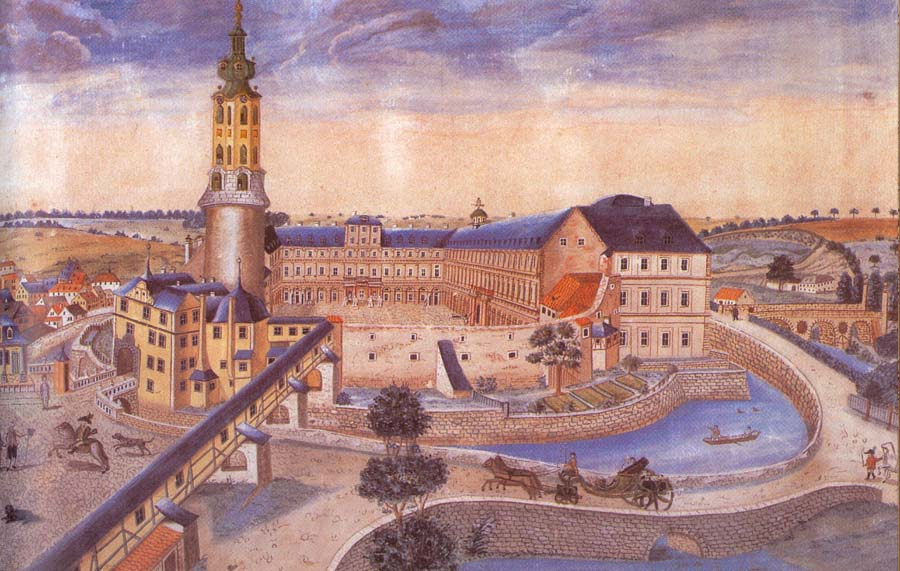
Schloss Weimar around 1730.

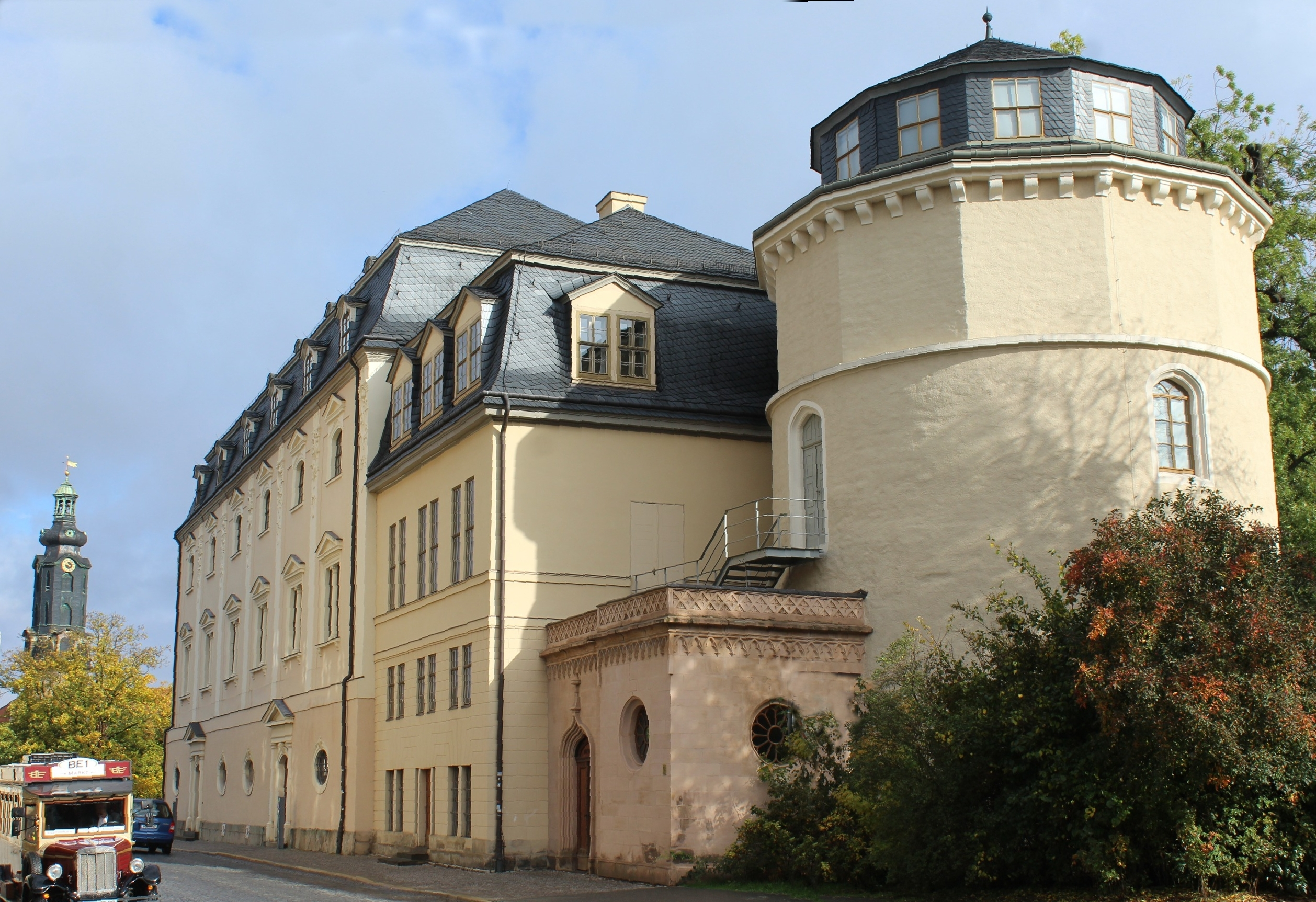
Grünes Schloss (Duchess Anna Amalia Library) in Weimar. Tower of the nearby Schloss Weimar on the left.

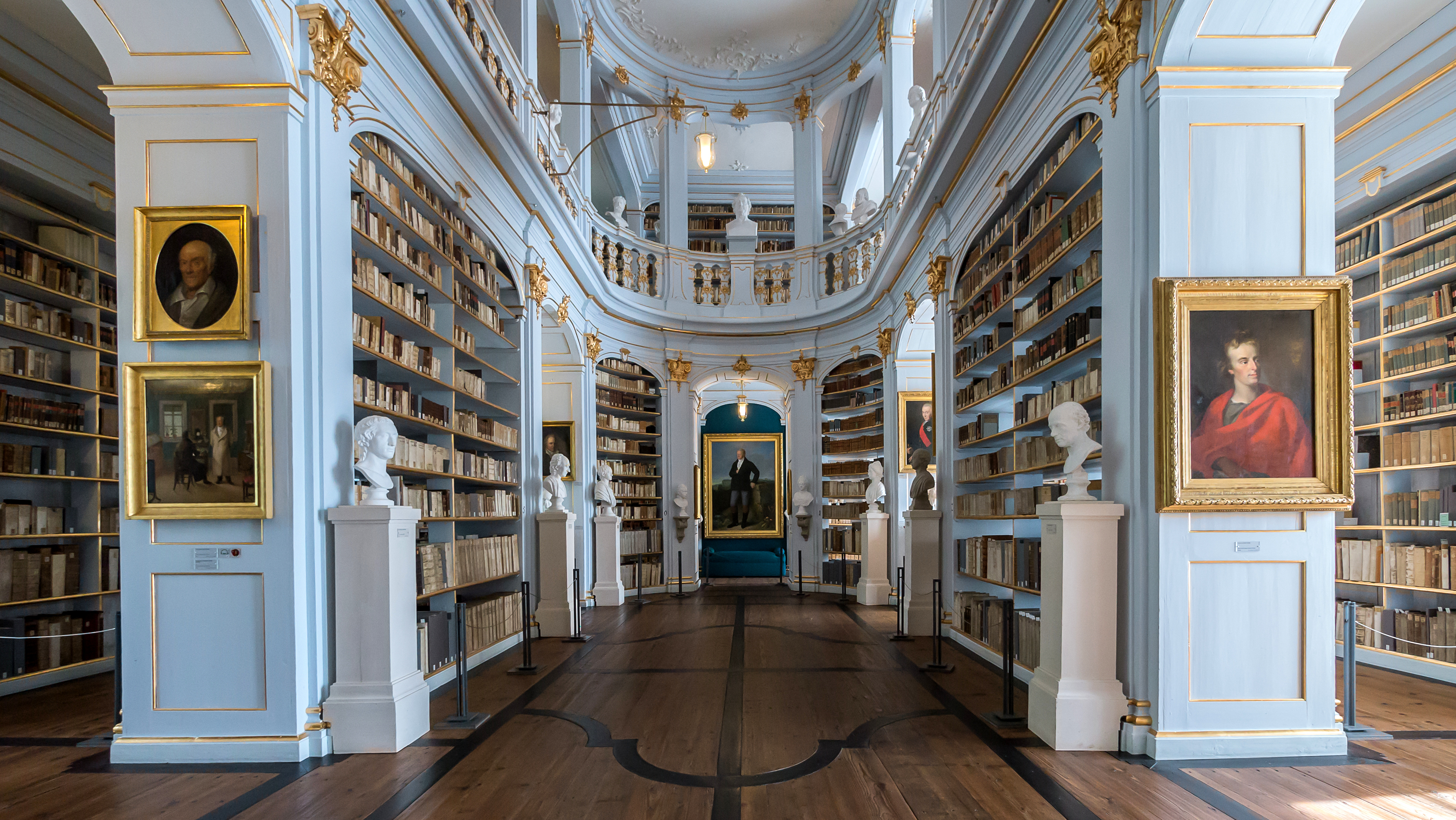
Rococo hall of the Grünes Schloss.

Five months after the presentation of the "Alles mit Gott und nichts ohn' ihn" poem and its setting to Duke Wilhelm Ernst, he promoted Bach to concertmaster (Konzertmeister), and commissioned him to compose, once a month, a new piece of church music. According to Maul, Bach being promoted to compose church music was likely, at least in part, due to his setting of Mylius's ode. Possibly the aria was performed again in 1715 in Pforta.

=== Conservation and recovery of the dedication copy ===
The dedication copy of Mylius's ode, containing Bach's autograph of its setting, was stored in the library of the Duke's palace, Schloss Weimar. In 1766 the content of that library was moved to the nearby Grünes Schloss, out of reach of the fire that destroyed Schloss Weimar in 1774. The library in the Grünes Schloss was later renamed to Duchess Anna Amalia Library (Herzogin Anna Amalia Bibliothek, HAAB). Together with other congratulatory documents received by the Dukes of Weimar, the dedication copy of BWV 1127 was stored on the second gallery level of the Rococo hall of the library. The luxurious binding of these pieces drew attention, and for classifying them they were moved to the restoration workshop outside the library building shortly before the Rococo hall burnt to the ground in September 2004.

In January 2005, as part of a program that had been initiated in 2002, Maul started his research, looking for Baroque era music-related documentation, in the HAAB. On 17 June he was given access to the boxes with congratulatory tributes that were salvaged from the 2004 fire. Among these tributes was the dedication copy of Mylius's and Bach's "Alles mit Gott und nichts ohn' ihn". Authenticated, the newly discovered composition was given the Bach-Werke-Verzeichnis number 1127. The shelf number of the dedication copy containing Mylius's ode and its setting by Bach, in the HAAB, is D-WRz B 24.

The new find was valued for several reasons:

- It is the only known composition by Bach in the strophic aria format.
- It documents Bach's activities for civil occasions in his Weimar period.

=== Score editions ===
Bärenreiter published several editions of the score of BWV 1127:

- The first edition, in 2005, edited by Maul.
- A facsimile edition, edited by Wolff.
- The New Bach Edition (German: Neue Bach-Ausgabe), completing its activities in 2007, published BWV 1127 in a supplement, edited by Maul.

A high resolution digital facsimile of D-WRz B 24 became available on the HAAB and Bach Digital websites.

=== 21st-century performances and recordings ===
Part of the rediscovered aria was recorded by soprano Ah Hong and harpsichordist Joseph Gascho on 9 June 2005, and aired the next day on NPR. Another preliminary performance, by Claron McFadden and Polo de Haas, was broadcast in the Dutch TV-show Nova. The official world première recording of the aria, by John Eliot Gardiner conducting the English Baroque Soloists and soprano Elin Manahan Thomas, was released in September 2005. This recording contained three stanzas of the aria, with a performance time of 12:16. Ton Koopman's recording, on which Lisa Larsson sang the solo part, was released a few months later in Vol. 20 of his complete recording of Bach's cantatas. Koopman made a selection of four stanzas of the aria for his recording, with a performance time of 16:52.

The first complete recording of BWV 1127, that is, including all 12 stanzas of the aria with a recording time of 48:30, was realised by Masaaki Suzuki, Carolyn Sampson, and the Bach Collegium Japan, and released in January 2006 on the 30th volume of Suzuki's complete Bach cantatas project. Daniel Abraham's recording, with The Bach Sinfonia and soprano Amanda Balestrieri, was released in 2006. Dorothee Mields recorded four stanzas of the aria with L'Orfeo Barockorchester conducted by Michi Gaigg, in December 2014. Carus-Verlag released this recording, with a performance time of 15:03, a year later. Mields released, courtesy of Naxos of America, part of this recording, that is the first stanza of Bach's aria (3:50), on YouTube in 2016.

== Sources ==
- "Alles mit Gott und nichts ohn' ihn (aria) BWV 1127". Bach Digital. Leipzig: Bach Archive; et al. 30 March 2020.
- Ambrose, Z. Philip; Maul, Michael (eds.). "BWV 1127 Alles mit Gott und nichts ohn' ihn: 52nd Birthday of Wilhelm Ernst, Duke of Weimar". Classics. www.uvm.edu. University of Vermont.
- Bach, Johann Sebastian (October 1713). Alles mit Gott und nichts ohn' Jhn: Aria Soprano Solo é Ritornello (in German). Lyrics by Mylius, Johann Anton (Facsimile ed.). Weimar: Duchess Anna Amalia Library.
- Bach, Johann Sebastian (2005). Maul, Michael (ed.). Alles mit Gott und nichts ohn' ihn BWV 1127 (1st ed.). Bärenreiter. ISMN 9790006530625. BA 5246.
- Bach, Johann Sebastian (2007). Wolff, Christoph (ed.). Aria "Alles mit Gott und nichts ohn' ihn" BWV 1127. Documenta musicologica. Vol. II/33. Introduction by Michael Maul; Recording by John Eliot Gardiner (Facsimile ed.). Bärenreiter. ISBN 9783761818701. BVK 1870.
- Child, Fred; Ronish, Marty (9 June 2005). "Unknown Bach Aria Discovered in Germany". NPR.
- Maul, Michael (2005). ""Alles mit Gott und nicht ohn' ihn" – Eine neu aufgefundene Aria von Johann Sebastian Bach". In Wollny, Peter (ed.). Bach-Jahrbuch 2005 [Bach Yearbook 2005]. Bach-Jahrbuch (in German). Vol. 91. Neue Bachgesellschaft. Leipzig: Evangelische Verlagsanstalt (published 2006). pp. 7–34. doi:10.13141/bjb.v2005. ISBN 3-374-02301-0. ISSN 0084-7682.
- Maul, Michael; et al. (2006). 30: Alles mit Gott (PDF) (liner notes). Carolyn Sampson, Bach Collegium Japan, Masaaki Suzuki. BIS Records. BIS-1471 SACD – via Chandos Records.
- Maul, Michael, ed. (2011). "V. Aria "Alles mit Gott und nichts ohn' ihn" BWV 1127". Johann Sebastian Bach: Beiträge zur Generalbaß- und Satzlehre, Kontrapunktstudien, Skizzen und Entwürfe – Anhang. New Bach Edition (in German). Vol. Supplement. Johann-Sebastian-Bach-Institut Göttingen, Bach-Archiv Leipzig. Bärenreiter. pp. 233–246. ISMN 9790006545377. BA 5291-01.
- Mylius, Johann Anton (30 October 1713). Des Durchlauchtigsten Fuersten und Herrn HERRN Wilhelm Ernsts Herzogs zu Sachsen, Juelich, Cleve und Berg ... Wahl-Spruch Oder SYMBOLUM, Omnia cum DEO, & nihil sine eo. Alles mit GOTT und nichts ohn Jhn. Aus ... Schuldigkeit erwogen und ... An Jhr. ... Durchl. den XXX. Octobr. MDCCXIII. ... Geburths-Tage ueberreicht (in German). Weimar: Mumbachische Schrifften.
- Mylius, Johann Christoph [at Wikisource] (1751–1752). Historia Myliana (in Latin). Vol. I–II. Jena: Cröcker.
- Rettinghaus, Klaus, ed. (13 January 2020). "D-WRz B 24". Bach Digital. Leipzig: Bach Archive; et al.
- Van der Lint, Peter (17 September 2005). "Koopman verliest race van Gardiner om BWV 1127" [Koopman loses race from Gardiner regarding BWV 1127]. Trouw (in Dutch).
- Wolf, Uwe, ed. (2007). Die Neue Bach-Ausgabe 1954–2007: Eine Dokumentation [The New Bach Edition 1954–2007: A documentation] (PDF) (in German). Contributions by Georg von Dadelsen, Alfred Dürr, Hans-Joachim Schulze, Frieder Zschoch and others. Bärenreiter. p. 50.
- Wolff, Christoph; et al. (2005). J. S. Bach: Cantatas Vol. 20 (liner notes). Ton Koopman and the Amsterdam Baroque Orchestra & Choir. Antoine Marchand. CC72220. Plain text version of these liner notes partially available at Christoph Prégardien's website. The subscription website Scribd also hosts a copy of these notes.
- Wollny, Peter; Gascho, Joseph; Hong, Ah; Lewis, J. Reilly (10 June 2005). "The Story Behind Bach's Unknown Aria". Morning Edition (Interview). Interviewed by Child, Fred; Inskeep, Steve; Montagne, Renée. NPR.
- Wollny, Peter (2008). "Bekennen will ich seinen Namen: Authentizität, Bestimmung und Kontext der Arie BWV 200. Anmerkungen zu Johann Sebastian Bachs Rezeption von Werken Gottfried Heinrich Stölzels" [Bekennen will ich seinen Namen: authenticity, purpose and context of the aria BWV 200. Annotations regarding Johann Sebastian Bach's reception of Gottfried Heinrich Stölzel's works]. Bach-Jahrbuch 2008 [Bach Yearbook 2008]. Bach-Jahrbuch (in German). Vol. 94. Neue Bachgesellschaft. Leipzig: Evangelische Verlagsanstalt. pp. 123–158. doi:10.13141/bjb.v2008. ISBN 978-3-374-02668-5. ISSN 0084-7682.
