= Michael Maul =

German music historian (born 1978)

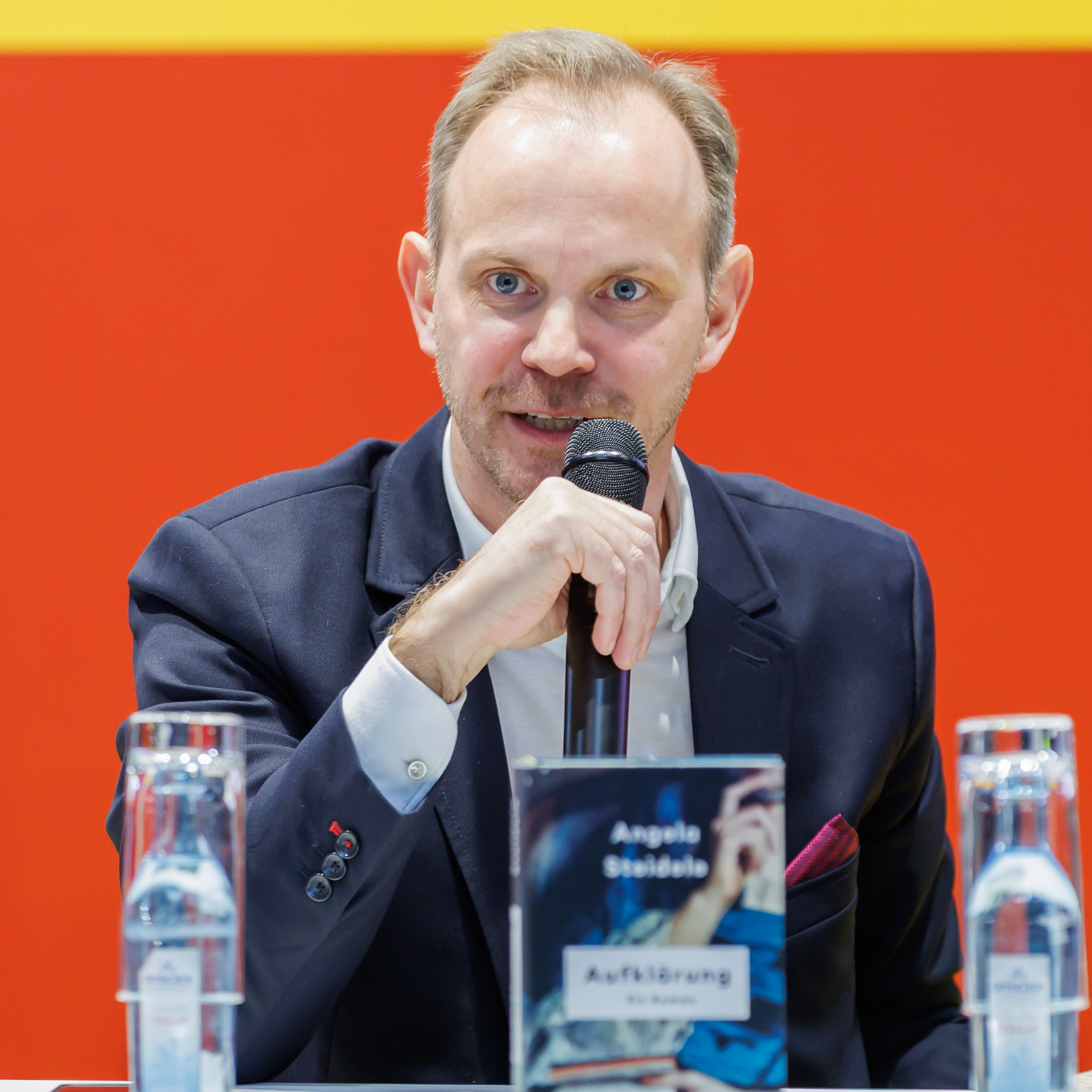
Maul in 2025 at the Leipzig book fair

Michael Maul (born 1978) is a German musicologist noted for his work on Johann Sebastian Bach. Maul was born in Leipzig, and is still based in the city, although his work at the Bach Archive has involved travel to archives and libraries elsewhere to explore sources relating to Bach. He is also artistic director of Leipzig's annual Bach festival.

== Education ==
Maul was awarded a PhD by the University of Freiburg for a dissertation on Baroque opera. It formed the basis of his book Barockoper in Leipzig (1693–1720).

== Bach discoveries ==
Maul's work attracted international attention with a discovery he made in 2005 in Weimar's Duchess Anna Amalia Library. This was a hitherto overlooked manuscript containing Alles mit Gott und nichts ohn' ihn, BWV 1127, the first previously unknown vocal work by Bach to be found in 70 years.

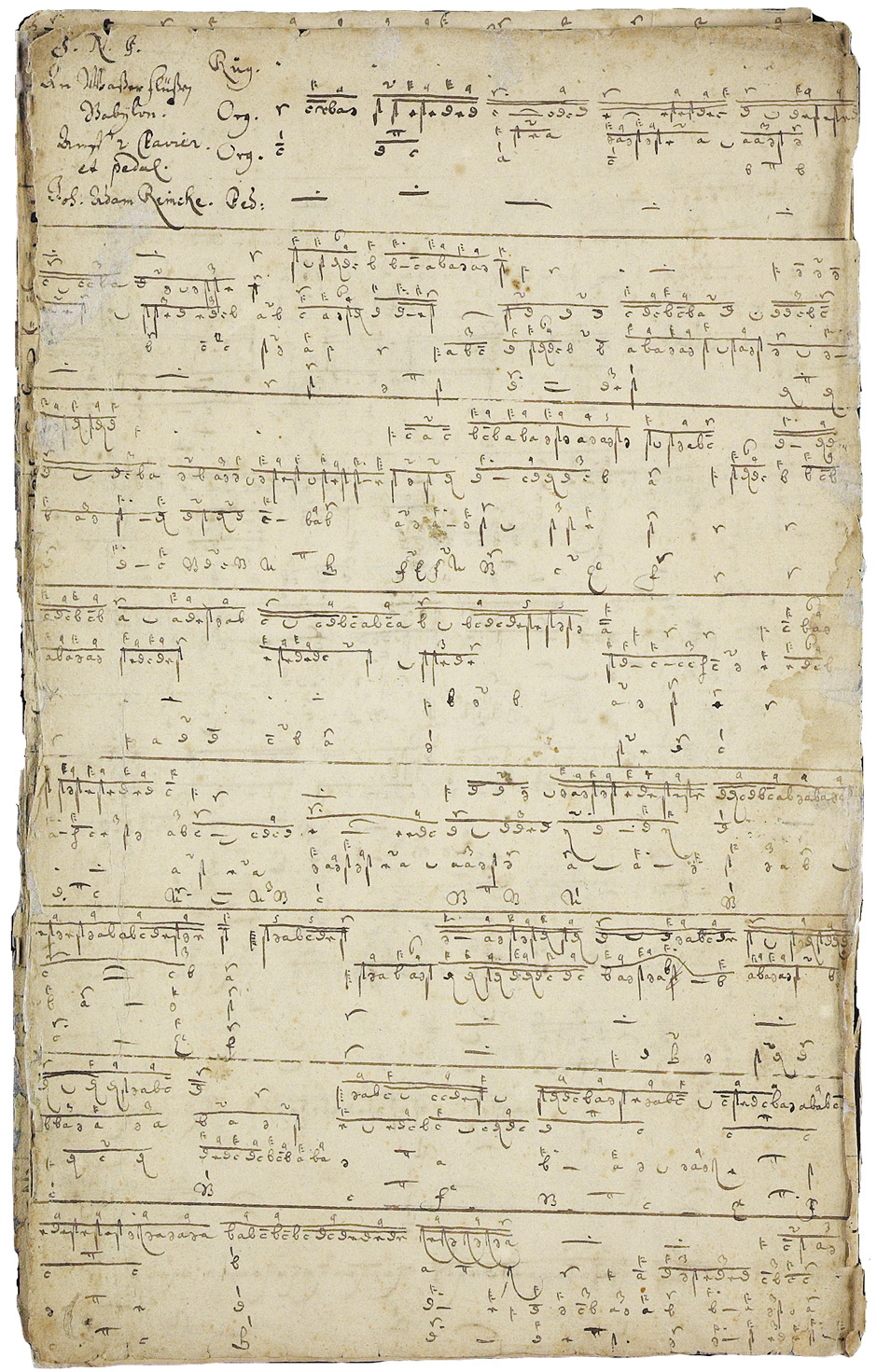
Organ tablature of a work by Reincken, apparently copied by Bach

Further research in Weimar identified other previously unknown manuscripts in Bach's hand, this time of music by other composers, throwing light on his musical education. Maul has suggested that there are probably still unidentified Bach manuscripts waiting to be discovered.

== Bibliography ==
- Barockoper in Leipzig (1693–1720). 2 vols. (Rombach Wissenschaften, Reihe Voces, Bd. 12.) Freiburg im Breisgau: Rombach, 2009 ISBN 978-3-7930-9584-2
- Bach’s Famous Choir. Saint Thomas School in Leipzig (1212–1804). Translated by Richard Howe. Boydell & Brewer Ltd 2018 ISBN 978-1-78327-169-6
- Bach–Eine Bildbiografie / A Pictorial Biography. Leipzig: Lehmstedt, 2021 ISBN 978-3-95797-101-2
