= Song of Songs 8 =

Eighth chapter of the Song of Songs

- ← chapter 7 Isaiah 1 →
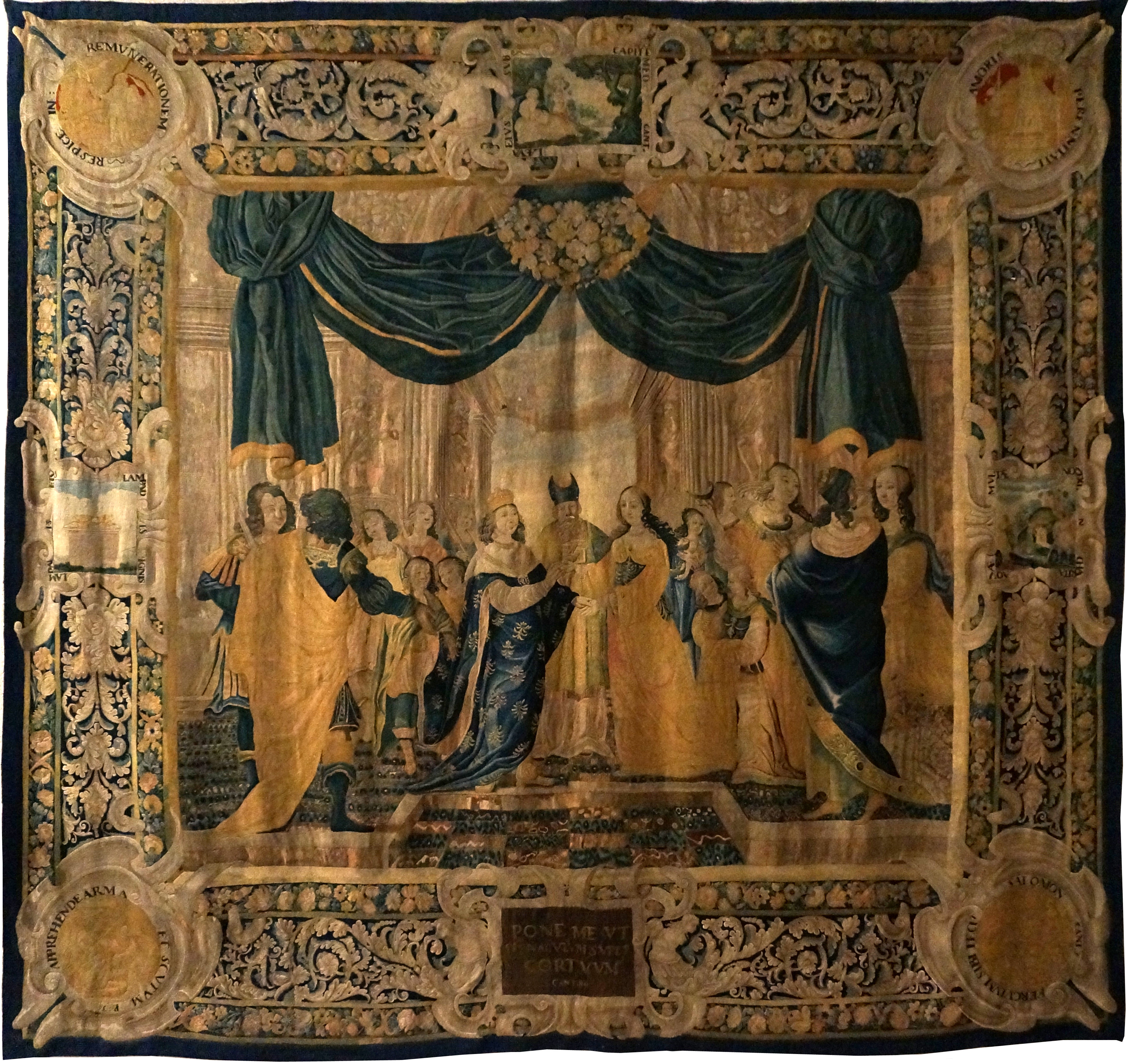
- French tapestry with the text of Song 8:6 in Latin: "Pone me ut signaculum super cor tuum" (English: "Set me as a seal upon thine heart"). Palais du Tau, Reims, Hauteville, Aisne (17th century).
- Book: Song of Songs
- Category: Ketuvim
- Christian Bible part: Old Testament
- Order in the Christian part: 22

Song of Songs 8 (abbreviated as Song 8) is the eighth (and the final) chapter of the Song of Songs in the Hebrew Bible or the Old Testament of the Christian Bible. This book is one of the Five Megillot, a collection of short books, together with Ruth, Lamentations, Ecclesiastes and Esther, within the Ketuvim, the third and the last part of the Hebrew Bible. Jewish tradition views Solomon as the author of this book (although this is now largely disputed), and this attribution influences the acceptance of this book as a canonical text.

This chapter contains dialogues between the woman and the daughters of Jerusalem, the woman and her brothers, then finally, the woman and the man, the "bride" and the "bridegroom".

== Text ==
The original text is written in Hebrew language. This chapter is divided into 14 verses.

=== Textual witnesses ===
Some early manuscripts containing the text of this chapter in Hebrew are of the Masoretic Text, which includes the Codex Leningradensis (1008). (Note: Since 1947 the current text of Aleppo Codex is missing Song of Songs 3:11, after the word ציון ("Zion"), to the end.)

There is also a translation into Koine Greek known as the Septuagint, made in the last few centuries BCE. Extant ancient manuscripts of the Septuagint version include Codex Vaticanus (B; $\mathfrak{G}$^{B}; 4th century), Codex Sinaiticus (S; BHK: $\mathfrak{G}$^{S}; 4th century), and Codex Alexandrinus (A; $\mathfrak{G}$^{A}; 5th century).

== Structure ==
The Modern English Version (MEV) identifies the speakers in this chapter as:

- Song 8:1–4 = The Woman (continuing from Song of Songs 7:10-13)
- Song 8:5a = Friends of the Woman
- Song 8:5b–7 = The Woman
- Song 8:8–9 = Brothers of the Woman
- Song 8:10–12 = The Woman
- Song 8:13 = The Man
- Song 8:14 = The Woman

Kugler and Hartin treat verses 5 onwards as an appendix. The Jerusalem Bible treats verse 7b onwards (from Were a man to offer all the wealth of his house to buy love ...) as "appendices".

== Female: Springtime and love (8:1–4) ==
This female passage is the last part of a long section concerning the desire and love in the country which runs from chapter 6 until verse 4 here. It consists probably or possibly of more than a single song, describing the woman's wish that her lover to be her brother, so that they can be together in her 'mother's house' (verses 1–2; cf. Song 3:4); they embrace (verse 3; cf. Song 2:6) and another appeal to the daughters of Jerusalem (verse 4).

=== Verse 1 ===
Oh, that you were like my brother,
Who nursed at my mother’s breasts!
If I should find you outside,
I would kiss you;
I would not be despised.

For "like my brother", or "as my brother" in the King James Version, the International Standard Version notes that the Hebrew text lacks the preposition "like". Andrew Harper argues that the word 'as' "should probably be omitted, as the accidental repetition of the last letter of the preceding word".

=== Verse 4 ===
I charge you, O daughters of Jerusalem,

do not stir up or awaken love
until it pleases.

- Cross references: Song of Songs 2:7; 3:5.
- "Charge" or "adjure"

The names of God are apparently substituted with similar sounding phrases depicting 'female gazelles' (צְבָא֔וֹת, tseḇā’ōṯ) for [God of] hosts (צבאות tseḇā’ōṯ), and 'does of the field'/'wild does/female deer' (אילות השדה, ’ay-lōṯ ha-śā-ḏeh) for God Almighty (אל שדי, ’êl shaddai).

== Chorus: Search for the couple (8:5a) ==
Verse 5 opens the last section or epilogue of the book, speaking about the power of love which continues to verse 14 (the end of the book).

=== Verse 5 ===
[Friends of the Woman]

Who is that coming up from the wilderness,

leaning upon her beloved?

[The Woman]

Under the apple tree I awakened you.

There your mother was in labor with you;
there she who bore you was in labor.

- "Who is that coming up from the wilderness": a reprise of Song 3:6.
- "Your mother": this is the only time the man's mother is mentioned, whereas the woman's mother is mentioned in five places (Song 1:6; 3:4, 6:9; 8:1,2), and one mention of Solomon's mother (Song 3:11).

== Female: The power of love (8:5b-7) ==
There are two fragments of the female voice in this part (verse 5; cf. 3:6–12, 2:3) and verses 6-7 containing her declaration of love which 'might have constituted a suitable end for the whole book'.

=== Verse 6 ===
Set me as a seal upon your heart,

as a seal upon your arm;

for love is strong as death,

passion fierce as the grave.

Its fires of desire are as ardent flames,

a most intense flame.

- "Fierce": "cruel" (in KJV and NKJV), "severe", lit. "hard". from Hebrew: קָשָׁ֥ה, qā-shāh.
- "The grave": or "Sheol".
- "A most intense flame": lit. "a flame of Yah", poetic form of "YHWH", "the Lord". from Hebrew: שלהבתיה, shal-he-ḇeṯ-yāh.

== Brothers: Their younger sister (8:8-9) ==
These two verses form a part describing how the woman's maternal brothers decide to keep their sister's virginity, when necessary. However, they do that in disparaging way, which recalls their maligning attitude in chapter 1.

== Female: Her defense; Solomon's vineyard (8:10–12) ==
As a response, the woman answers her brothers mockingly. When in Song 1:5–6 she "ineffectually complained" about her brothers' antagonism towards her, here she can stand up for herself and has found her peace.

=== Verse 12 ===
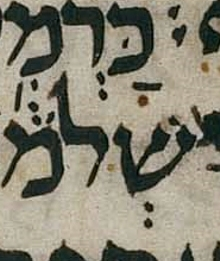
A full-color photograph of the word כרמי in the Leningrad Codex, Song of Songs 8:12, showing that the vowel under the first letter is patah and not qamaz.

My vineyard, my very own, is before me;

you, O Solomon, may have the thousand,
and the keepers of the fruit two hundred.

- "My vineyard": the emphatic Hebrew expression כרמי, kar-mî (from kerem for "vineyard"), as the first word of this verse, is to provide contrast to Solomon’s large possession and yet beyond his reach.
- "Solomon": one of the seven times this name is mentioned in the whole book (in Song 1:1, 3, three times in 3:6–11 and two times in this chapter: 8:10–12).

== Male: Listening (8:13) ==
No doubt that this part contains the words of the man addressing the bride that 'it is delightful to him to hear her voice'.

=== Verse 13 ===
You who dwell in the gardens,
The companions listen for your voice—
Let me hear it!

The man (or the bridegroom) calls upon his bride (the Shulammite) to let his companions, that is 'his friends who may have come to congratulate him on his bride's safe return', hear her voice.

In the community of Sephardic and Oriental Jews, the congregation in traditional synagogues goes back and recites verse 13 after reciting verse 14 to avoid ending a reading in a negative note. (Note: This practice is similar to the custom of ending the reading of the book of Lamentations on the Fast of Ab, by repeating verse 5:21 after reading the last verse of the book, 5:22.)

== Female: Departure (8:14) ==
The very last verse: the woman's voice calls to her male lover to run, like a gazelle or deer, to “the distant nevernever land of the perfume hills”. With that, ‘the love's game can begin afresh, suspended in timelessness and moving cyclically’.

=== Verse 14 ===
Make haste, my beloved,

and be like a gazelle or a young stag
on the mountains of spices!

This verse is almost identical to Song 2:17 and just like in the situation of the earlier verse, it implies another meeting and prolongs "indefinitely the moment of young and love".

- "Make haste": "hurry", lit. "flee", from Hebrew: ברח, bə-rakh,

== See also ==
- Gazelle
- Jerusalem
- Vineyard
- Related Bible parts: Song of Songs 1, Song of Songs 7

== Sources ==
- Assis, Elie (2009). Flashes of Fire: A Literary Analysis of the Song of Songs. T & T Clark. ISBN 9780567027641.
- Bergant, Dianne (2001). Cotter, David W.; Walsh, Jerome T.; Franke, Chris (eds.). The Songs of Songs. Berit Olam (The Everlasting Covenant): Studies In Hebrew Narrative And Poetry. Liturgical Press. ISBN 9780814650691.
- Bloch, Ariel; Bloch, Chana (1995). The Song of Songs: A New Translation, With an Introduction and Commentary. Random House. ISBN 9780520213302.
- Brenner, Athalya (2007). "21. The Song of Solomon". In Barton, John; Muddiman, John (eds.). The Oxford Bible Commentary (first (paperback) ed.). Oxford University Press. pp. 429–433. ISBN 978-0199277186.
- Coogan, Michael David (2007). Coogan, Michael David; Brettler, Marc Zvi; Newsom, Carol Ann; Perkins, Pheme (eds.). The New Oxford Annotated Bible with the Apocryphal/Deuterocanonical Books: New Revised Standard Version, Issue 48 (Augmented 3rd ed.). Oxford University Press. ISBN 9780195288810.
- Exum, J. Cheryl (2005). Songs of Songs: A Commentary. Old Testament library (reprint ed.). Westminster John Knox Press. ISBN 9780664221904.
- Halley, Henry H. (1965). Halley's Bible Handbook: an abbreviated Bible commentary (24th (revised) ed.). Zondervan Publishing House. ISBN 0-310-25720-4.
- Hess, Richard S. (2005). Songs of Songs. Baker Commentary on the Old Testament Series. Baker Academic. ISBN 9780801027123.
- Longman, Tremper (2001). Songs of Songs. The New International Commentary on the Old Testament. Vol. 26. Wm. B. Eerdmans Publishing. ISBN 9780802825438.
- Würthwein, Ernst (1995). The Text of the Old Testament. Translated by Rhodes, Erroll F. Grand Rapids, MI: Wm. B. Eerdmans. ISBN 0-8028-0788-7.
