= Song of Songs 3 =

Third chapter of the Song of Songs

- ← chapter 2 chapter 4 →
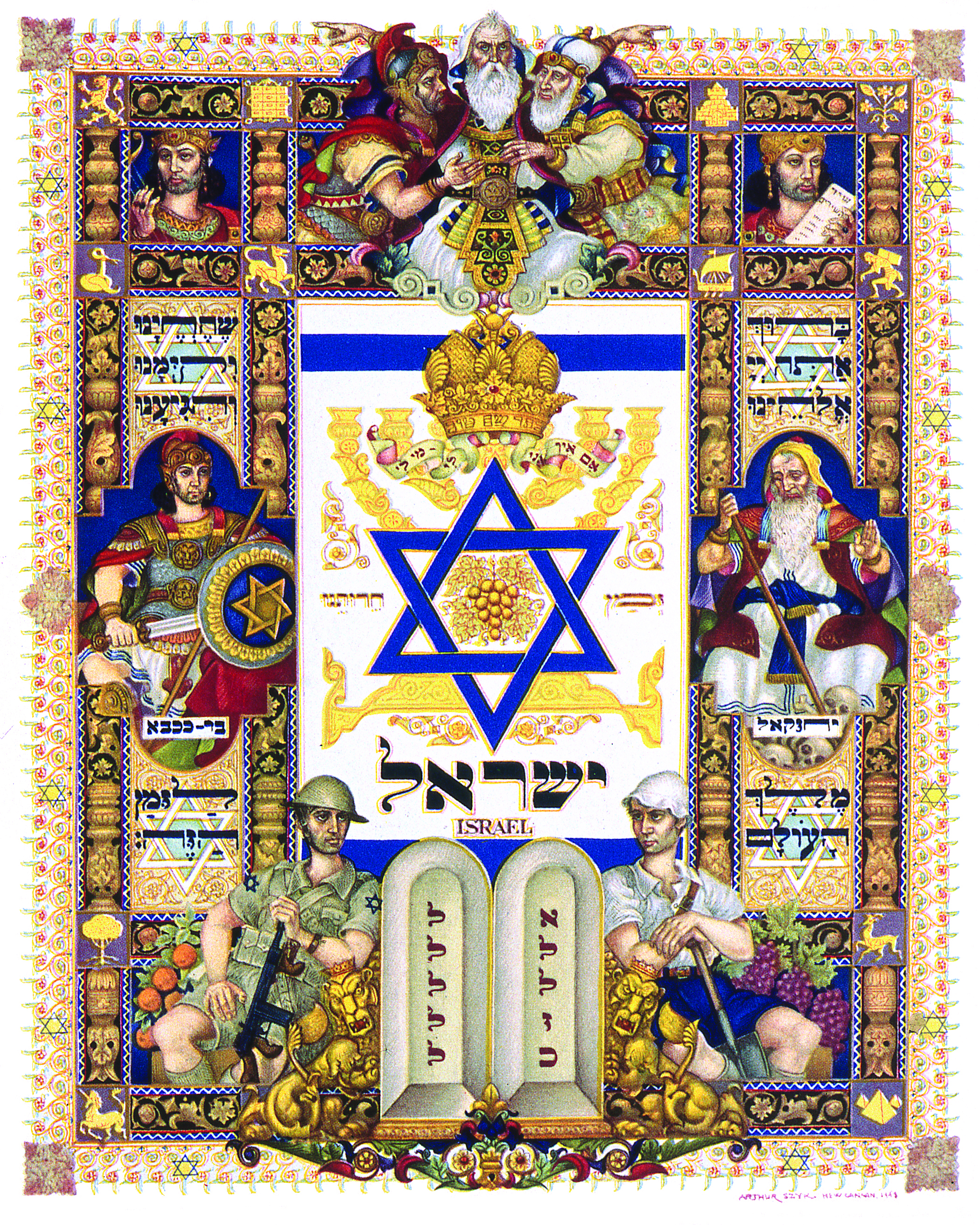
- Four thousand years of Jewish history come to life in Arthur Szyk's Visual History of Israel, completed in 1948, depicting, among others, King Solomon (top right), shown holding a copy of 'Song of Songs'.
- Book: Song of Songs
- Category: Ketuvim
- Christian Bible part: Old Testament
- Order in the Christian part: 22

Song of Songs 3 (abbreviated as Song 3) is the third chapter of the Song of Songs in the Hebrew Bible or the Old Testament of the Christian Bible. This book is one of the Five Megillot, a collection of short books, together with Ruth, Lamentations, Ecclesiastes and Esther, within the Ketuvim, the third and the last part of the Hebrew Bible. Jewish tradition views Solomon as the author of this book (although this is now largely disputed), and this attribution influences the acceptance of this book as a canonical text. This chapter contains a female song about her search for her lover at night and the poem describing King Solomon's procession.

== Text ==
The original text is written in Hebrew language. This chapter is divided into 11 verses.

=== Textual witnesses ===
Some early manuscripts containing the text of this chapter in Hebrew are of the Masoretic Text, which includes the Aleppo Codex (10th century), (Note: Since 1947 the current text of Aleppo Codex is missing Song of Songs 3:11, after the word ציון ("Zion"), to the end.) and Codex Leningradensis (1008). Some fragments containing parts of this chapter were found among the Dead Sea Scrolls: 4Q106 (4QCant^{a}); 30 BCE-30 CE; extant verses 3–5, 7–11), 4Q107 (4QCant^{b}); 30 BCE-30 CE; extant verses 1–2, 5, 9–11), and 4Q108 (4QCant^{c}); 30 BCE-30 CE; extant verses 7–8).

There is also a translation into Koine Greek known as the Septuagint, made in the last few centuries BCE. Extant ancient manuscripts of the Septuagint version include Codex Vaticanus (B; $\mathfrak{G}$^{B}; 4th century), Codex Sinaiticus (S; BHK: $\mathfrak{G}$^{S}; 4th century), and Codex Alexandrinus (A; $\mathfrak{G}$^{A}; 5th century).

== Structure ==
New King James Version (NKJV) groups this chapter into:

- Song 3:1–5 = A Troubled Night
- Song 3:6–11 = The Coming of Solomon

== Female: Search and seizure (3:1-5) ==
The first part of this chapter is "a tightly constructed song" of the female protagonist, describing how she looks for her lover at night (or in a dream) in the city streets, until she finds him and brings him into her mother's house. The setting of this poem progresses from the woman's bed (verse 1) to the public areas of the city (verses 2-4b) and finally to the privacy of her mother's bedroom (verses 4c-5). It closes with the second appeal to the 'daughters of Jerusalem'.

=== Verse 1 ===
On my bed by night I sought him whom my soul loves;

I sought him, but found him not.

"By night" (Hebrew: בלילות, ba-lê-lō-wṯ) can be read as "nightly" or "night after night": the word "refers to more nights than one". The woman had expected her lover to return "before dawn"; Hudson Taylor notes that she might have regretted "lightly dismiss[ing] Him, with the thought: A little later I may enjoy His love ... Poor foolish bride!"

=== Verse 5 ===
I charge you, O daughters of Jerusalem,
By the gazelles or by the does of the field,
Do not stir up nor awaken love
Until it pleases.

- Cross references: Song of Songs 2:7; 8:4
- "Charge" or "adjure"

The names of God are apparently substituted with similar sounding phrases depicting 'female gazelles' (צְבָא֔וֹת, tseḇā’ōṯ) for [God of] hosts (צבאות tseḇā’ōṯ), and 'does of the field'/'wild does/female deer' (אילות השדה, ’ay-lōṯ ha-śā-ḏeh) for God Almighty (אל שדי, ’êl shaddai).

== Male: Marriage scene (3:6-11) ==
This section starts a poetic exposition of love and marriage which form the core of the book (Song 3:6-5:1). Hess applies these six verses to the man, whereas Fox prefers the daughter of Jerusalem as the speakers, and the New King James Version assigns them to "the Shulamite" (= the woman).

Solomon is the focus of this section, as his name is mentioned three times (verses 7, 9 and 11), and the suffix 'his' (-o) refers to him once in verse 7, another in verse 9 and four times in the second part of verse 11. The last word of this part is 'his heart' (libbo), referring directly to the essential aspect of King Solomon and the most relevant to the whole love poem. The mention of Solomon's mother in verse 11 is in line with the focus on mothers in the book, both the woman's (1:6; 3:4; 6:9; 8:1, 2) and the man's (8:5).

== See also ==
- Jerusalem
- Zion
- Related Bible parts: Song of Songs 2

== Sources ==
- Bergant, Dianne (2001). Cotter, David W.; Walsh, Jerome T.; Franke, Chris (eds.). The Songs of Songs. Berit Olam (The Everlasting Covenant): Studies In Hebrew Narrative And Poetry. Liturgical Press. ISBN 9780814650691.
- Brenner, Athalya (2007). "21. The Song of Solomon". In Barton, John; Muddiman, John (eds.). The Oxford Bible Commentary (first (paperback) ed.). Oxford University Press. pp. 429–433. ISBN 978-0199277186.
- Coogan, Michael David (2007). Coogan, Michael David; Brettler, Marc Zvi; Newsom, Carol Ann; Perkins, Pheme (eds.). The New Oxford Annotated Bible with the Apocryphal/Deuterocanonical Books: New Revised Standard Version, Issue 48 (Augmented 3rd ed.). Oxford University Press. ISBN 9780195288810.
- Exum, J. Cheryl (2005). Songs of Songs: A Commentary. Old Testament library (reprint ed.). Westminster John Knox Press. ISBN 9780664221904.
- Halley, Henry H. (1965). Halley's Bible Handbook: an abbreviated Bible commentary (24th (revised) ed.). Zondervan Publishing House. ISBN 0-310-25720-4.
- Hess, Richard S. (2005). Songs of Songs. Baker Commentary on the Old Testament Series. Baker Academic. ISBN 9780801027123.
- Longman, Tremper (2001). Songs of Songs. The New International Commentary on the Old Testament. Vol. 26. Wm. B. Eerdmans Publishing. ISBN 9780802825438.
- Würthwein, Ernst (1995). The Text of the Old Testament. Translated by Rhodes, Erroll F. Grand Rapids, MI: Wm. B. Eerdmans. ISBN 0-8028-0788-7.
