= The Bach Sinfonia =

The Bach Sinfonia is an American musical ensemble based out of Washington D.C. that specializes in the performance of 18th-century music using historically informed performance practices. Founded in 1995 by music director Daniel Abraham, the ensemble consists of an orchestra reflecting the size and instrumentation of the baroque period as well as a number of vocal and instrumental soloists. The ensemble has been featured on National Public Radio's Performance Today and has recorded works by Johann Sebastian Bach and George Frideric Handel.

== Sources ==
- Biography at bach-cantatas.com
