= Duchess Anna Amalia Library =

UNESCO World Heritage Site
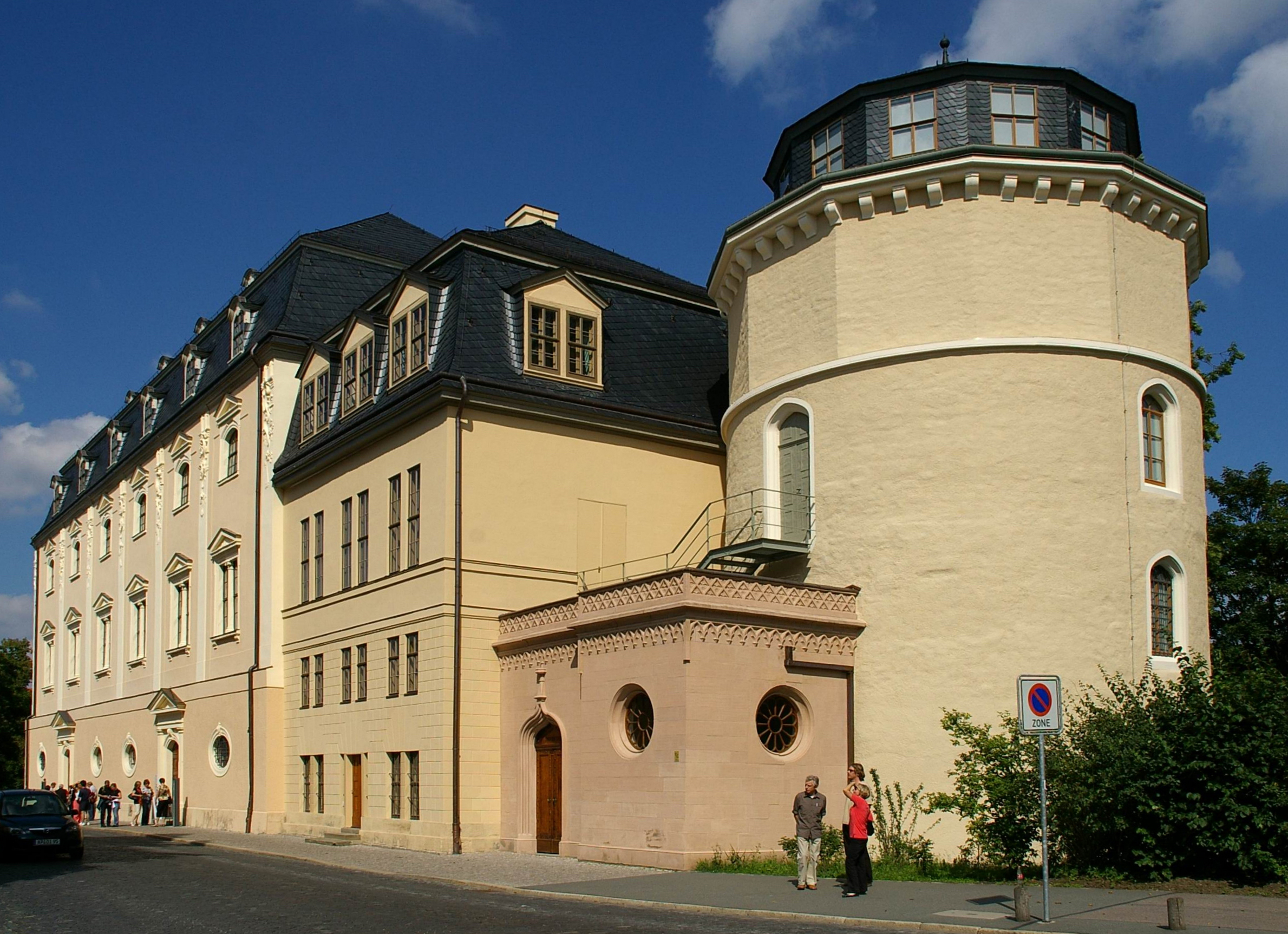

- Location within Germany Location within Thuringia
- Location: Weimar, Germany
- Part of: Classical Weimar
- Criteria: Cultural: (iii)(vi)
- Reference: 846-006
- Inscription: 1998 (22nd Session)
- Website: www.klassik-stiftung.de/en/institutions/herzogin-anna-amalia-bibliothek
- Coordinates: 50°58′43″N 11°19′56″E

Duchess Anna Amalia Library, Weimar

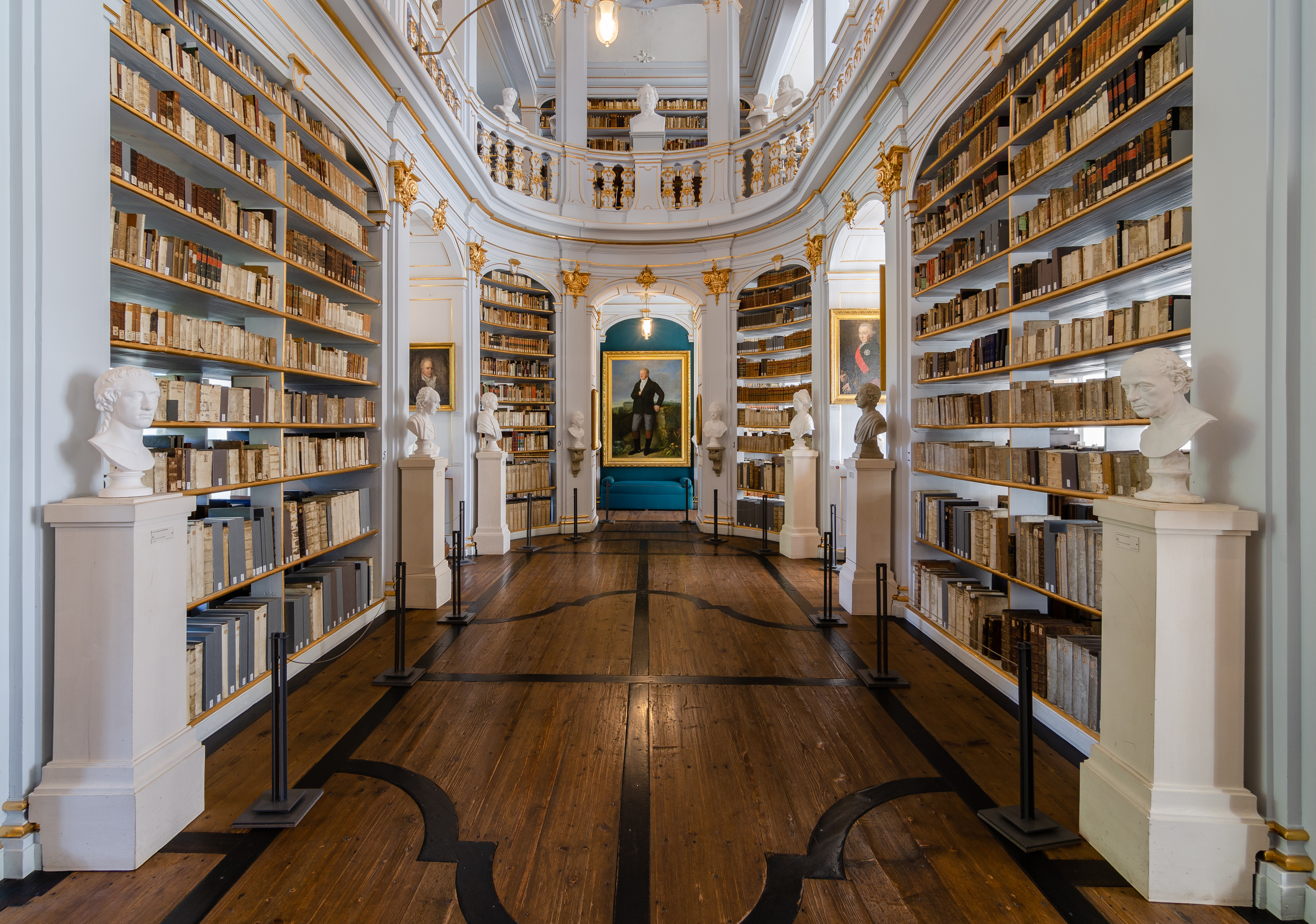
Main building in the Green Palace – Rococo hall – central aisle

The Duchess Anna Amalia Library (German: Herzogin Anna Amalia Bibliothek) in Weimar, Germany, houses a major collection of German literature and historical documents. In 1991, the tricentennial of its opening to the public, the Ducal Library was renamed for Duchess Anna Amalia. Today, the library is a public research library for literature and art history. The main focus is German literature from the Classical and the late Romantic eras. The ducal library was supplied, among others, by the bookseller Hoffmann from Weimar as well as with publications from France and Europe by the Strasbourg publishing house Bauer, Treuttel and Würtz. The library was inscribed on the UNESCO World Heritage List as part of the Classical Weimar site because of its testimony to the global cultural importance of Weimar during the late 18th and early 19th centuries during the Weimar Classicism movement.

In 2004 a fire destroyed the main wing and a substantial part of the collection; restoration of salvaged volumes lasted until 2015.

== Contents ==
The library contains over 1,000,000 items, 150,000 of which are available for open use and borrowing. The research library has approximately 850,000 volumes with collection emphasis on the German literature. Among its special collections is an important Shakespeare collection of approximately 10,000 volumes, as well as a 16th-century Bible connected to Martin Luther.

== Building ==
The main building is the Green Castle (Grünes Schloss), which had been built between 1562 and 1565. The architect was Nikolaus Gromann.

In 2001, construction began on a new multiple-floor facility to house some 1,000,000 books under the "Square of Democracy" (Platz der Demokratie) between the Music University and the Red and Yellow Castle. In its pre-renovation state, the building had structural flaws which endangered many valuable books and the special collections.

The new development is estimated to have cost €24 million and has an area of 6,300 m^{2}. The area is divided into upper and lower floors. The new building connects the historical library building with the user areas of the reconstructed Red and Yellow Castle. The grand opening of the new wing took place in February 2005.

== History ==
Anna Amalia, Duchess of Saxe-Weimar-Eisenach, had the building converted into a library in 1761, and in 1766 arranged for the courtly (hoefische) book collection to be moved into the library. The Duchess, seeking a tutor for her son Duke Carl August, hired Christoph Martin Wieland, an important poet and noted translator of William Shakespeare. Wieland's Shakespeare volumes formed the core of the collection.

From an architectural standpoint, the library is world-famous for its oval Rococo hall featuring a portrait of Grand Duke Carl August.

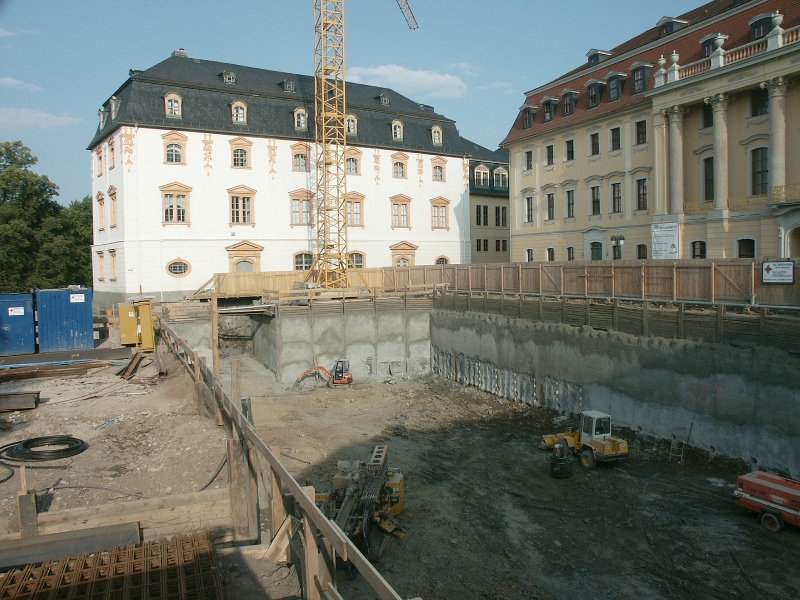
Work on the Extension, June 2002

One of the library's most famous patrons was Johann Wolfgang von Goethe, who worked there from 1797 to 1832. The library also includes the world's largest Faust collection. The Duchess's significant 13,000-volume music collection is also available in the library.

=== Fire of 2004 ===
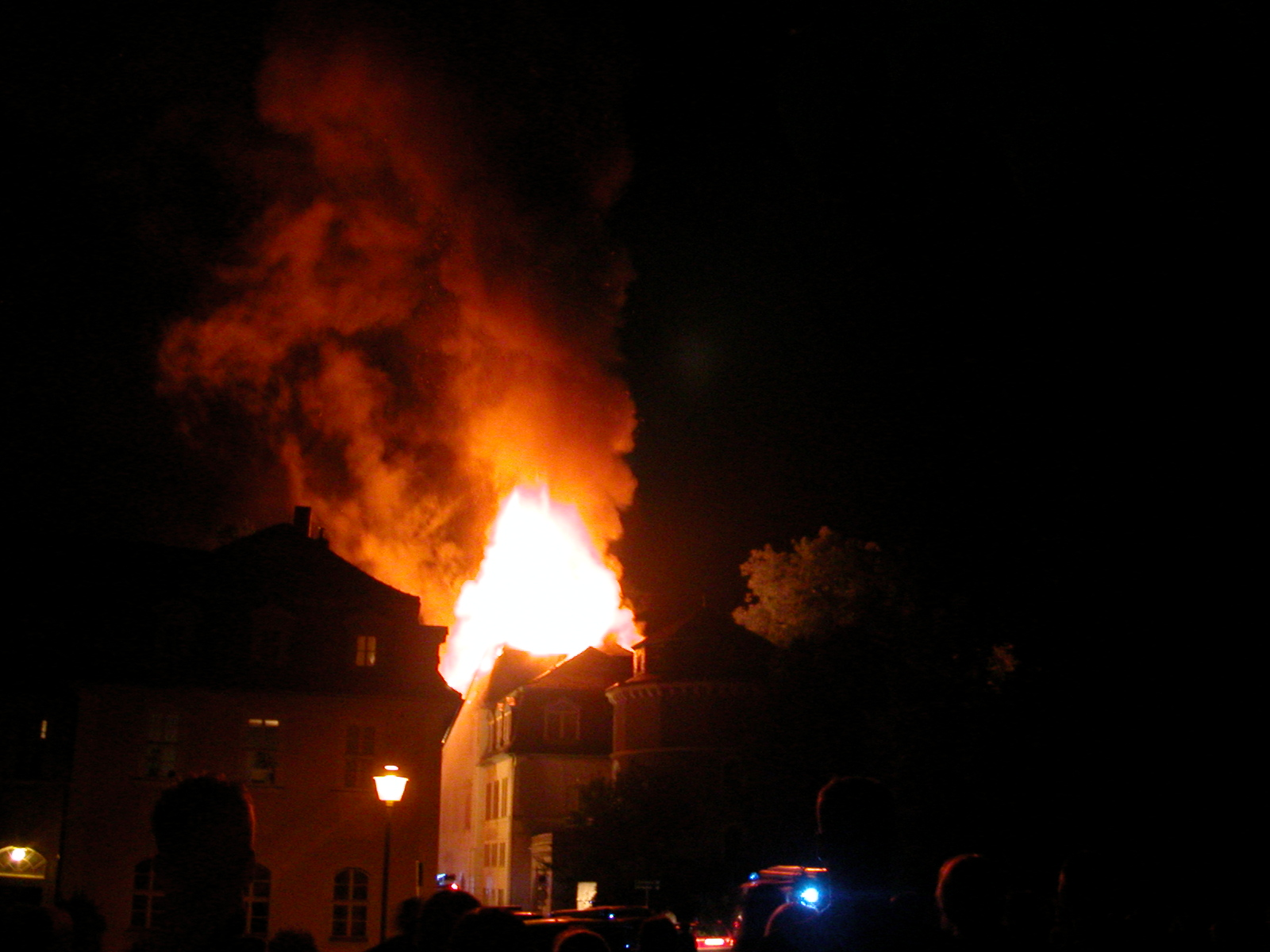
The Library burning

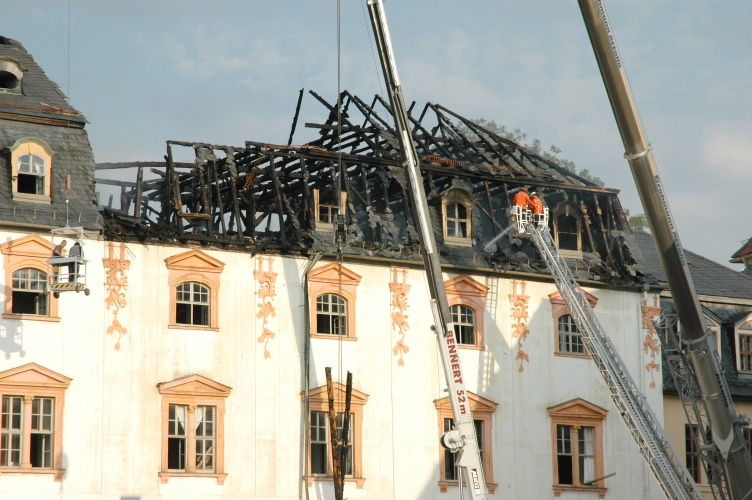
The damage next day

Part of the collection was burned in a fire on 2 September 2004, which destroyed 50,000 volumes of which 12,500 are considered irreplaceable. Another 62,000 volumes were severely damaged. The cause of the fire was a corroded clamp connection of an aluminum and a copper cable, that smoldered for a long time behind a wall panel in the attic before the fire detectors sounded the alarm. The Herzogin Anna Amalia Library fire was the largest library fire in Germany since World War II.

However, some 6,000 historical works were saved, including the 1534 Luther Bible and a collection of Alexander von Humboldt's papers, by being passed from hand to hand out of the building. Some 28,000 books in the building were rescued and so not affected by the fire. Other items, like Friedrich Schiller's death mask, suffered damage too, and 35 historic oil paintings were destroyed.

The fire came as a particular tragedy, in part because the collection was scheduled to move to another site in late October, little more than a month later. Some of the damaged books were freeze-dried in Leipzig to save them from building mildew as a result of water damage. Book restoration was scheduled to last at least until 2015.

In June 2005, it was announced that among the manuscripts that were out of the building at the time of the fire, and thus saved from damage, there was a hitherto undiscovered 1713 aria by Johann Sebastian Bach entitled "Alles mit Gott und nichts ohn' ihn".

The library building was restored for $18.2 million and reopened at the end of October 2007 with some 60,000 volumes. This includes the undamaged books, the first restored books and the replacement volumes obtained on the international antique book market, from other libraries, or by donation. An online database lists the books the library is still seeking in order to replace volumes it lost.
