= Daniel Abraham (conductor) =

American conductor and musicologist (born 1968)

Daniel E. Abraham (born 1968) is an American conductor and musicologist. He studied conducting under Paul Traver at the University of Maryland and William Weinert at the Eastman School of Music. Known for both his research and knowledge in the area of early music and the music of the baroque period, Abraham has written several publications on the topic of historically informed performances.

Abraham has received numerous awards. In 1996, he was the recipient of the Irving Lowens Award for excellence in student musicological research and in 1998 he received the Daniel Pomeroy Prize from the American Handel Society, for Performance and Scholarship in Eighteenth-Century Music. In 1997, he was a Conducting Fellow at the Oregon Bach Festival, where he studied under Helmuth Rilling. He has also studied privately with David Hoose of Boston University.

He is currently the Director of Choral Activities at American University in Washington, D.C., where he teaches courses and directs AU's Chamber Singers group. He also serves as the director of The Bach Sinfonia, which he founded in 1995. Other positions he has held at AU are the Chair of the Department of Performing Arts from 2009 to 2011 and the Director of Music from 2000 to 2006.
