= List of compositions by Gottfried Heinrich Stölzel =

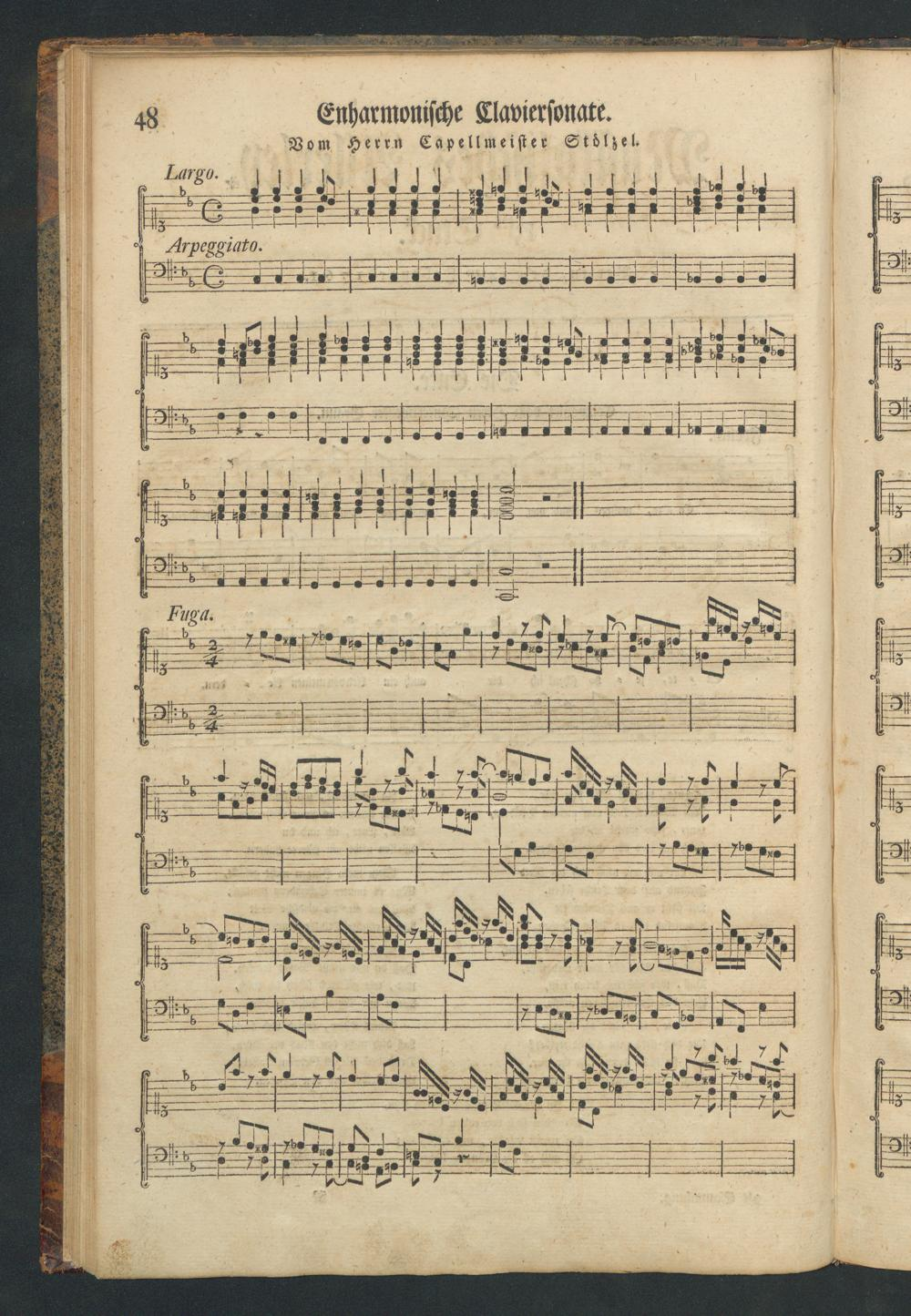
In 1761 Friedrich Wilhelm Birnstiel published Stölzel's Enharmonische Claviersonate (enharmonic keyboard sonata) in the second volume (13th instalment) of his Musikalisches Allerley.

Gottfried Heinrich Stölzel (1690–1749) was a baroque composer who primarily worked in Gotha. He was a very prolific composer whose output includes numerous cantatas and instrumental music.

== Cantatas ==
In his catalogue published in 1976 Fritz Hennenberg numbered 442 of Stölzel's church cantatas and 27 of his secular cantatas as surviving with music. Hennenberg also numbered the cantata cycles, although some of his assumptions in that regard were later revised after further research. After the publication of Hennenberg's catalogue over 50 other extant church cantatas have been authenticated as Stölzel's.

In the listing below Hennenberg (H., also HenS) numbers are indicated where available. H. numbers can be preceded by "KK" (for church cantatas), "WK" (secular cantatas) or "apokr." (apocryphal composition with lyrics by Stölzel). "A", "B" and "C" respectively indicate cantatas surviving with music, cantatas surviving by their libretto exclusively and cantatas only known by their title. If there is no indicator between the "H." abbreviation and the number, then the number refers to a church cantata with extant music (e.g., H. 438 = H. KK A 438). Alternatively the sublist to which a cantata belongs can be indicated by a page number: e.g. HenS 438 p. 131 = H. KK A 438 and HenS 21 p. 160 = H. KK C 21.

=== Church cantatas ===
Shortly after assuming his office in Gotha Stölzel wrote a cycle of six Christmas cantatas. Year cycles of church cantatas include:

- 1720–21: on a cycle of librettos by Johann Oswald Knauer, published as Gott-geheiligtes Singen und Spielen
- Probably 1722–23: on librettos from Erdmann Neumeister's Neue Geistliche Gedichte
- "Saitenspiel" (String-Music) cycle, thus named after Benjamin Schmolck's second libretto cycle, published in 1720, an "ideal cycle" containing 88 cantata texts. Schmolck provided more than one cantata text for some of the most important feasts. Schmolck's librettos have five sections: Aria, Recitative, Aria, Recitative and Aria. Stölzel split the librettos he used in two halves, adding a chorale from the hymnal used in Gotha as a conclusion of each half: thus the structure of his cantatas based on Schmolck's librettos became (Part I:) Aria – Recitative – Aria – Chorale, and (Part II:) Recitative – Aria – Chorale. The cycle was performed in Zerbst (1724–25), after a presumed earlier performance of the cycle in Gotha. Extant music ("A" cantatas formerly associated with the fourth cycle; "C" cantatas recovered in Hamburg):
  - H. KK A 438: Sei du mein Anfang und mein Ende for the first Sunday of Advent (I)
  - H. KK A 42 and 46: Wunder-Mutter, Wunder-Kind and Wer wollte dich nicht fest an Brust und Herze schließen, two halves of the same cantata for the first Sunday after Christmas (X)
  - H. KK C 21: Kommt, ihr frohen Morgenländer for Epiphany (XIII)
  - H. KK C 23: Ertönt, ihr Hütten der Gerechten for Easter (XXIX, zu Mittage)
  - H. KK C 24: Verstelle dich nur immerhin for Easter Monday (XXX)
  - H. KK C 27: Was soll ich an der Erde kleben for Ascension (XXXVII)
  - H. KK C 30: Mein Gott, was ist mir deine Liebe for Pentecost Monday (XLI)
  - H. KK C 31: Drei in einem, eins in dreien for Trinity Sunday (XLIII)
  - H. KK C 22: Gottes und Marien Kind for Annunciation (LXXII)
  - H. KK C 32: Mein Heil, mein Teil for Visitation (LXXIV)
  - Possibly two further cantatas in the Nägeli legacy in Zürich
- 1725–26: on librettos by Neumeister and Lorenz Reinhardt from the Musicalische Kirchen-Andachten collection
- 1728–29 (fourth cycle): A double cantata cycle on librettos by Stölzel published as Texte zur Kirchen-Music. Hennenberg erroneously placed some of the "Saitenspiel" cantatas in this cycle. Christmas cantatas of this cycle as oratorio: see below.

From 1730 to 1745 Stölzel wrote six more cantata cycles, including:

- 1731–32: "Namenbuch" (Namebook) double cantata cycle, consisting of 70 settings of librettos found in Schmolck's third cycle (published in 1726). The structure of these librettos is comparable to those of the "Meiningen" cycle published in 1704. Extant scores of the Namebook cycle indicate the cantatas were later performed in halves in Sondershausen (i.e. the first half having been performed in the morning, the second half in the afternoon). In addition to Schmolck's texts, Stölzel added a chorale as conclusion of the first part to each cantata. For 36 of these cantatas most of both halves survives, while for one of them (for Ascension) only the first half is extant.
- 1732–33 and 1733–34: two single cycles
- 1735–36: double cycle based on librettos from Johannes Caspar Manhardt's Erbauliche Kirchen-Andachten
- 1737–38: Stölzel's 10th cycle, Musicalische Lob- und Danck-Opfer, was a single cycle based on his own librettos.
- 1743–44: single cycle based on Stölzel's own librettos.

Most of the sacred cantatas are for occasions of the liturgical year, although there are also church cantatas for other occasions such as birthday celebrations of his employer.

H. 1–297:

- H. 1: Wache auf, der du schläfest
- H. 2: Du Tochter Zion freue dich sehr
- H. 3: Die Stunde ist da aufzustehen vom Schlaf
- H. 4: Hosianna dem Sohne David
- H. 5: Siehe der Richter ist vor der Thür
- H. 6: Man wird sie nennen das heilige Volck
- H. 7: Herr erhalt uns dein Wort
- H. 8: So nun diß alles zergehen soll
- H. 9: Es ist aber geschrieben uns zur Warnung
- H. 10: Es ist nahe kommen das Ende aller Dinge
- H. 11: Siehe ich komme im Buch ist von mir geschrieben
- H. 12: Als die Armen aber die viel reich machen
- H. 13: Du aber was richtest du deinen Bruder
- H. 14: Dem Gerechten muß das Licht immer wieder aufgehen
- H. 15: Der Herr wird ans Licht bringen was im Finstern verborgen ist
- H. 16: Bist du der da kommen soll
- H. 17: Es ist ein Gott und ein Mittler zwischen Gott und den Menschen
- H. 18: So man von hertzen gläubet so wird man gerichtet
- H. 19: Der Herr ist nahe, sorget nicht
- H. 20: So man mit dem Munde bekennet so wird man seelig
- H. 21: Ich freue mich im Herrn
- H. 22: Ein jeglicher prüfe sein selbst Werck
- H. 23: Uns ist ein Kind geboren
- H. 24: Sehet welch eine Liebe hat uns der Vater erzeiget
- H. 25: Das Volck so im Finstern wandelt.
- H. 26: Euch ist heute der Heyland geboren
- H. 27: Ach, daß die Hülfe aus Zion über Israel käme
- H. 28: Ehre sei Gott in der Höhe
- H. 29: Ich habe dich je und je geliebet
- H. 30: Er wird dich mit seinen Fittichen bedecken
- H. 31: Siehe, ich sehe den Himmel offen
- H. 32: Denen aus Zion wird ein Erlöser kommen
- H. 33: Ich sehe den Himmel offen
- H. 34: Ihr sollt nicht wähnen
- H. 35: Wie teuer ist deine Güte, Gott
- H. 36: In allen Dingen lasset uns beweisen als die Diener Gottes
- H. 37: Lasset uns ihn lieben
- H. 38: Wenn dein Wort offenbar wird, so erfreut es
- H. 39: Herr, du weisest alle Dinge
- H. 40: Machet die Tore weit
- H. 41: Kündlich groß ist das gottselige Geheimnis, for the third day of Christmas 1735
- H. 42: Wunder-Mutter, Wunder-Kind
- H. 43: Er heißet wunderbar
- H. 44: Das Alte ist vergangen siehe es ist alles neu
- H. 45: Das Ende eines Dinges ist besser denn sein Anfang
- H. 46: Wer wollte dich nicht fest an Brust und Herze schließen
- H. 47: Wie viel ihn aufnahmen, denen gab er Macht, Gottes Kinder
- H. 48: Alles was ihr tut mit Worten oder Werken
- H. 49: Ihr seid alle Gottes Kinder durch den Glauben
- H. 50: Saget Dank alle Zeit für alles
- H. 51: Euch aber, die ihr meinen Namen fürchtet, soll aufgehen
- H. 52: Träume sind nichts
- H. 53: Nun aber bleibt Glaube, Hoffnung, Liebe, diese drei
- H. 54: Sehet, wir gehen hinauf gen Jerusalem
- H. 55: Über alles zieht an die Liebe
- H. 56: Mein Freund ist mir ein Püschel Myrrhen
- H. 57: Mein Kind, willst du Gottes Diener sein
- H. 58: Dein Wort ist meines Fußes Leuchte
- H. 59: Ich bin vor vielen wie ein Wunder
- H. 60: Wir haben nicht einen Hohenpriester
- H. 61: Selig sind, die reines Herzens sind
- H. 62: Ich lasse dich nicht, du segnest mich denn
- H. 63: Selig sind, die reines Herzens sind
- H. 64: Laß mich gehen, denn die Morgenröte bricht an
- H. 65: Was hat das Licht für Gemeinschaft mit der Finsternis
- H. 66: Dankest du also dem Herrn, deinen Gott
- H. 67: Ihr seid nun Gottes Nachfolger als die lieben Kinder
- H. 68: Dazu ist erschienen der Sohn Gottes, daß er die Werke
- H. 69: Das Gesetz ist durch Mosen gegeben
- H. 70: Wirf dein Anliegen auf den Herrn
- H. 71: Ihr seid zur Freiheit berufen
- H. 72: Aller Augen warten auf dich, Herr
- H. 73: Christus ist durch sein eigen Blut einmal in das Heilige
- H. 74: Wahrlich, ich sage euch, so jemand mein Wort wird halten
- H. 75: Das Blut Jesu Christi, des Sohnes Gottes, macht uns rein
- H. 76: Gedenket an den, der ein solches Widersprechen von den Sündern
- H. 77: Siehe, eine Jungfrau ist schwanger
- H. 78: Wie lieblich sind auf den Bergen die Füße der Boten
- H. 79: Tue ein Zeichen an mir
- H. 80: Christus kommt her aus den Vätern
- H. 81: Ein jeglicher sei gesinnet wie Jesus Christus auch war
- H. 82: Siehe, ich komme, im Buch ist von mir geschrieben
- H. 83: Christus, ob er wohl hätte mögen Freude haben, duldete er
- H. 84: Saget der Tochter Zion, siehe, dein Heil kommt
- H. 85: Wer gewaschen ist, darf nicht denn die Füße waschen
- H. 86: Wache auf, der du schläfest
- H. 87: Die Rechte des Herrn ist erhöhet
- H. 88: Sind wir aber mit Christo gestorben, so glauben wir auch
- H. 89: Ich war tot und siehe, ich bin lebendig
- H. 90: Wir haben auch ein Osterlamm
- H. 91: Ich bin die Auferstehung und das Leben
- H. 92: Ob ich schon wandert im finsteren Tal, fürchte ich kein Unglück
- H. 93: Bleibe bei uns, denn es will Abend werden
- H. 94: So du mit deinem Munde bekennest Jesum, daß er der Herr sei
- H. 95: Wandle vor mir und sei fromm
- H. 96: Die Sonne geht heraus wie ein Bräutigam aus seiner Kammer
- H. 97: Der Herr wird zu uns kommen
- H. 98: Gott hat den Herrn auferwecket
- H. 99: Ich will euch trösten
- H. 100: Ich will euch nicht Waisen lassen
- H. 101: Wo zwei oder drei versammelt sind in meinem Namen
- H. 102: Ach, daß ich hören sollte, daß Gott der Herre redete
- H. 103: Er heißet Friedefürst
- H. 104: Suche Friede und jage ihm nach
- H. 105: Unser Glaube ist der Sieg, der die Welt überwunden hat
- H. 106: Mein Freund ist mein
- H. 107: Ich weiß, an wen ich glaube
- H. 108: Es ist aber der Glaube eine gewisse Zuversicht
- H. 109: Er wird seine Herde weiden wie ein Hirte
- H. 110: Der Herr ist mein Hirte
- H. 111: Will mir jemand nachfolgen, der verleugne sich selbst
- H. 112: Der Herr ist mein Hirte
- H. 113: Meine Schafe hören meine Stimme
- H. 114: Siehe, wir preisen selig, die erduldet haben
- H. 115: Euch aber, die ihr meinen Namen fürchtet, soll aufgehen
- H. 116: Als die Traurigen aber allzeit fröhlich
- H. 117: Ich habe dich einen kleinen Augenblick verlassen
- H. 118: Ich bin beide, dein Pilgrim und dein Bürger
- H. 119: Die mit Tränen säen, werden mit Freuden ernten
- H. 120: Was hast du, o Mensch, daß du nicht empfangen hast
- H. 121: Wo hat sich dein Freund hingewandt
- H. 122: Niemand kommt zum Vater, denn durch mich
- H. 123: Nun komme ich zu dir und rede solches in der Welt
- H. 124: Alle gute Gabe und alle vollkommene Gabe kommt von oben herab
- H. 125: Weise mich, Herr, deinen Weg
- H. 126: Christus ist zur Rechten Gottes
- H. 127: Wahrlich, ich sage euch, so ihr den Vater etwas bitten werdet
- H. 128: Christus wird unsern nichtigen Leib verklären
- H. 129: Die wahrhaftigen Anbeter werden den Vater anbeten im Geist
- H. 130: Seid Täter des Worts und nicht Hörer allein
- H. 131: Bittet, so werdet ihr nehmen
- H. 132: Dieser Jesus, welcher vor euch aufgenommen ist gen Himmel
- H. 133: Wo euer Schatz ist, da ist auch euer Herz
- H. 134: Bitte, was ich dir tun soll
- H. 135: Und der Herr, nachdem er mit ihnen geredet hatte
- H. 136: Es wird ein Durchbrecher vor ihnen herauffahren
- H. 137: Selig sind, die um Gerechtigkeit willen verfolgt werden
- H. 138: Das weiß ich fürwahr, wer Gott dienet
- H. 139: Es ist nahe kommen das Ende aller Dinge
- H. 140: Wir sind stets als ein Fluch der Welt
- H. 141: Wohlzutun und mitzuteilen vergesset nicht
- H. 142: Uns ist bange, aber wir verzagen nicht
- H. 143: Stehe auf, Nordwind
- H. 144: Siehe da, eine Hütte Gottes bei den Menschen
- H. 145: Der Herr ist in seinem heiligen Tempel
- H. 146: Wisset ihr nicht, daß ihr Gottes Tempel seid
- H. 147: Werdet voll Geistes
- H. 148: Siehe da, eine Hütte Gattes bei den Menschen
- H. 149: Wie sollt er uns mit ihm nicht alles schenken
- H. 150: Daran ist erschienen die Liebe Gottes gegen uns
- H. 151: Wollte Gott, daß alle das Volk des Herrn weissagte
- H. 152: Daran ist erschienen die Liebe Gottes gegen uns
- H. 153: Rede Herr, dein Knecht höret
- H. 154: Gott ist die Liebe
- H. 155: Durch Christum haben wir auch einen Zugang im Glauben
- H. 156: Lehre mich hm nach deinem Wohlgefallen
- H. 157: So denn ihr, die ihr arg seid, könnet euren Kindern gute Gaben
- H. 158: Wer aus der Wahrheit ist, der höret meine Stimme
- H. 159: Wer Christi Geist nicht hat, der ist nicht sein
- H. 160: Herr, wie sind deine Werke so groß
- H. 161: Es sei denn, daß jemand wiedergeboren werde
- H. 162: Groß und wundersam sind deine Werke
- H. 163: Herr, weise mir deinen Weg
- H. 164: Meine Lehre ist nicht mein, sondern des, der mich gesandt hat
- H. 165: Welche nicht von dem Geblüte, noch von dem Willen des Fleisches
- H. 166: Wo euer Schatz ist, da ist auch euer Herz
- H. 167: Also gehet's, wer ihm Schätze sammelt und ist nicht reich
- H. 168: So jemand spricht, ich liebe Gott, und hasset seinen Bruder
- H. 169: Selig seid ihr Armen, denn das Reich Gottes ist euer
- H. 170: Gott ist die Liebe
- H. 171: Christus ward arm um euretwillen
- H. 172: Lasset uns nicht lieben mit Worten noch mit der Zungen
- H. 173: Schmecket und sehet, wie freundlich der Herr ist
- H. 174: Schmecket und sehet, wie freundlich der Herr ist
- H. 175: Verachtest du den Reichtum seiner Güte
- H. 176: Lasset uns nicht lieben mit Worten, sondern mit der Tat
- H. 177: Esset, meine Lieben
- H. 178: Widerstehet dem Teufel, so flieht er von euch
- H. 179: Ich bin ein verirret und verloren Schaf
- H. 180: So demütiget euch unter die gewaltige Hand Gottes
- H. 181: Dieser nimmt die Sünder an und isset mit ihnen
- H. 182: Kommt her zu mir alle, die ihr mühselig und beladen seid
- H. 183: Nahet euch zu Gott, so nahet er sich zu euch
- H. 184: Sei stille dem Herrn und warte auf ihn
- H. 185: Wohltun ist wie ein gesegneter Garten
- H. 186: Weil wir in der Hütten sind, sehen wir uns und sind beschwert
- H. 187: Gnädig und barmherzig ist der Herr
- H. 188: So ihr bleiben werdet an meiner Rede, so seid ihr meine rechten
- H. 189: Einer ist euer Meister, Christus
- H. 190: Gott hat uns gesegnet mit allerlei geistlichem Segen
- H. 191: Er reinigte ihm selbst ein Volk zum Eigentum
- H. 192: Der Herr lässet's den Aufrichtigen gelingen
- H. 193: Vertraue Gott und bleibe in deinem Beruf
- H. 194: Wer ist, der gut Leben begehrt
- H. 195: Im Schweiß deines Angesichts sollst du dein Brot essen
- H. 196: Wie sollten wir in der Sünde leben wollen
- H. 197: Vergebet euch untereinander, so jemand Klage hat wider
- H. 198: Da wir tot waren in Sünden, hat er uns samt Christo lebendig
- H. 199: Ein Mensch sieht, was vor Augen ist, aber Gott sieht das Herz an
- H. 200: Dies wird sein Name sein
- H. 201: Daß sie genennet werden Bäume der Gerechtigkeit
- H. 202: Wer Sünde tut, der ist der Sünden Knecht
- H. 203: Habe deine Lust an dem Herrn
- H. 204: So lasset nun die Sünde nicht herrschen
- H. 205: Woher nehmen wir Brot hier in der Wüsten
- H. 206: Wie sich ein Vater über Kinder erbarmet
- H. 207: Fürchtet den Herrn, ihr, seine Heiligen
- H. 208: Ich will dich unterweisen und dir den Weg zeigen, den du wandeln
- H. 209: Ihr Lieben, glaubet nicht einem jeglichen Geiste
- H. 210: Sind wir nun Kinder, so sind wir auch Erben
- H. 211: So sehet nun zu, daß ihr fürsichtiglich wandelt
- H. 212: Welche der Geist Gottes treibt, die sind Gottes Kinder
- H. 213: Kann man auch Trauben lesen von den Dornen
- H. 214: Sei nicht stolz, sondern fürchte dich
- H. 215: Es ist keine Kreatur für ihn unsichtbar
- H. 216: Wer sich läßt dünken erstehen, mag wohl zusehen, daß er nicht
- H. 217: Tue Rechnung von deinem Haushalten
- H. 218: Zur Zeit, wenn ich sie strafen werde
- H. 219: Ach, daß ich Wasser genug hätte in meinem Haupte
- H. 220: Dienet einander ein jeglicher mit der Gabe, die er empfangen hat
- H. 221: Beßere dich, Jerusalem, eh sich mein Herz von dir wende
- H. 222: Alle gute Gabe und alle vollkommene Gabe kommt von oben herab
- H. 223: Sehet zu, daß nicht jemand Gottes Gnade versäume
- H. 224: Hoffen wir allein in diesem Leben auf Christum
- H. 225: Ich weiß, mein Gott, daß du das Herz grüßt
- H. 226: Das Gesetz deines Mundes ist mir lieber denn viel tausend Stück
- H. 227: Ich bekenne dir meine Sünde
- H. 228: Er stößt die Gewaltigen vom Stuhl und erhebet die Niedrigen
- H. 229: Der Herr weiß die Gedanken der Menschen
- H. 230: Befiehl dem Herrn deine Wege und hoffe auf ihn
- H. 231: Befiehl dem Herrn deine Wege und hoffe auf ihn
- H. 232: Der Buchstabe tötet, der Geist aber machet lebendig
- H. 233: Wer Dank opfert, der preiset mich
- H. 234: Gott hat uns tüchtig gemacht, das Amt zu führen
- H. 235: Er hat alles wohl gemacht
- H. 236: Wir halten, daß der Mensch gerichtet werde
- H. 237: Das ist sein Gebot, daß wir glauben an den Namen seines Sohnes
- H. 238: Ist's aus Gnaden, so ist's nicht aus Verdienst
- H. 239: Die Haupt-Summa des Gebots ist Liebe
- H. 240: Wie schön und lieblich bist du, du Liebe in Wollüsten
- H. 241: Ich bin der Herr, dein Arzt
- H. 242: Das Fleisch gelüstet wider den Geist
- H. 243: Rufe mich an in der Not, so will ich dich erretten
- H. 244: Das Fleisch gelüstet wider den Geist
- H. 245: Opfere Gott Dank und bezahle dem Höchsten dein Gelübde
- H. 246: Ich bin arm und elend, der Herr aber sorgt für mich
- H. 247: Alle eure Sorgen werfet auf ihn
- H. 248: Wer auf sein Fleisch säet, der wird vom Fleisch des Verderbens
- H. 249: Wirf dein Anliegen auf den Herrn
- H. 250: Daß ihr begreifen möget mit allen Heiligen
- H. 251: Du hast Gewalt beides über Leben und Tod
- H. 252: Der Herr ist in seinem heiligen Tempel
- H. 253: Wir sind nicht von denen, die da weichen und verdammt werden
- H. 254: Das Gesetz ist unser Zuchtmeister gewesen
- H. 255: Es ist alles euer
- H. 256: Öffne mir die Augen, daß ich sehe die Wunder an deinem Gesetze
- H. 257: Lobe den Herrn, meine Seele
- H. 258: Sei getrost, mein Sohn, deine Sünden sind dir vergeben
- H. 259: Seid klug wie die Schlangen und ohne Falsch wie die Tauben
- H. 260: Selig sind, die zum Abendmahl des Lammes berufen sind
- H. 261: Ihr habt von uns empfangen, wie ihr sollt wandeln
- H. 262: So lasset uns nun fürchten
- H. 263: Die Waffen unsrer Ritterschaft sind nicht fleischlich
- H. 264: Herr, deine Augen sehen nach dem Glauben
- H. 265: Seid stark in dem Herrn und in der Macht seiner Stärke
- H. 266: Hab' ich dir nicht gesagt, so du glauben würdest
- H. 267: Ich bin erfüllet mit Trost
- H. 268: Herr, habe Geduld mit mir
- H. 269: In allen Dingen Lasset uns beweisen als die Diener Christi
- H. 270: Herr, gehe nicht ins Gericht mit deinem Knechte
- H. 271: Unser Wandel ist im Himmel
- H. 272: Die Welt ist voll Untreu und List
- H. 273: Fleischlich gesinnet sein ist der Tod
- H. 274: Es ist keine Obrigkeit, ohne von Gott
- H. 275: Herr, tue meine Lippen auf
- H. 276: Herr Zebaoth, wohl dem Menschen, der sich auf dich verläßt
- H. 277: Ich will, daß ihr weise seid aufs Gute, aber einfältig aufs Böse
- H. 278: Der Mensch ist in seinem Leben wie Gras
- H. 279: Ich werde nicht sterben, sondern leben
- H. 280: Dazu ist Christi gestorben und auferstanden
- H. 281: O Tod, wie bitter bist du, wenn an dich gedenkt ein Mensch
- H. 282: Es ist aber nahe kommen das Ende aller Dinge
- H. 283: Was du tust, so bedenke das Ende
- H. 284: Fürchtet Gott und gebt ihm die Ehre
- H. 285: Tröstet mein Volk
- H. 286: Gelobet sei der Herr, der Gott Israel
- H. 287: Siehe, ich will sie locken und will säe in eine Wüste führen
- H. 288: Freuet euch aber, daß eure Namen im Himmel geschrieben sind
- H. 289: Ich sitze unter dem Schatten, des ich begehre
- H. 290: Lobe den Herrn, meine Seele
- H. 291: Ich will dem David ein gerecht Gewächs aufgehen lassen
- H. 292: Lobe den Herrn, meine Seele
- H. 293: Groß sind die Werke des Herrn
- H. 294: Ich freue mich in dem Herrn
- H. 295: Gott aber sei Dank, der uns den Sieg gegeben hat
- H. 296: Der Herr hat seinen Engeln befohlen
- H. 297: Lasset uns doch den Herrn, unsern Gott, fürchten

In some instances Hennenberg's numbering follows the sequence of cantatas in manuscripts conserved at the Berlin State Library (SBB). Digital facsimiles of such manuscripts are often available at the website of that library and at the IMSLP website. For example, from a collective manuscript containing 26 church cantatas:

- Geht hin und lehret alle Völker, H. 298 (in two parts), for Trinity Sunday
- Drei sind die da zeugen im Himmel, H. 299 (in two parts), also for Trinity
- Herr wie lange willst du mein so gar vergessen, H. 300, for the second Sunday after Epiphany
- Es ist hie kein Unterschied sie sind allzumal Sünder, H. 301, for the 11th Sunday after Trinity
- Es wird Freude sein vor den Engeln Gottes, H. 302, for the third Sunday after Trinity
- Das ist je gewißlich wahr, H. 303, for the third Sunday after Trinity
- Es werden nicht alle die zu mir sagen, H. 304, for the eighth Sunday after Trinity
- Herr gehe nicht ins Gericht, H. 305, for the ninth Sunday after Trinity
- Meister was muß ich tun, H. 306, for the 13th Sunday after Trinity
- Du sollt Gott deinen Herren lieben, H. 307, for the 13th Sunday after Trinity
- Die da reich werden wollen, H. 308, for the 15th Sunday after Trinity
- Niemand kann zweien Herren dienen, H. 309, for the 15th Sunday after Trinity
- Herr lehre doch mich daß es ein Ende, H. 310, for the 16th Sunday after Trinity
- Er hat alles wohl gemacht, H. 311, for the 12th Sunday after Trinity
- Fürchte dich nicht du hast Gnade bei Gott funden, H. 312, for Annunciation
- Wir haben hier keine bleibende Stätte, H. 313, for Purification
- Der Engel des Herrn lagert sich, H. 314, for St. Michael's Day
- Sie sind allzumal dienstbare Geister, H. 315, for St. Michael's Day
- Widerstehet dem Teufel, H. 316, for St. Michael's Day
- O wie ist die Barmherzigkeit des Herrn so groß, H. 317, for the 12th Sunday after Trinity
- Seid barmherzig wie auch euer Vater barmherzig ist, H. 318, for the 22nd Sunday after Trinity
- Wer seine Missetat leugnet, H. 319, for the 11th Sunday after Trinity
- Befiehl dem Herrn deine Wege, H. 320, for the second Sunday after Trinity
- Der Herr sendet eine Erlösung seinem Volk, H. 321, for St. John's Day
- Herr tue meine Lippen auf, H. 322, for St. John the Evangelist
- Tue Rechnung von deinem Haushalten, H. 323, for the ninth Sunday after Trinity

From a composite manuscript containing 16 cantatas (copied c.1770):

- Halte im Gedächtnis Jesum Christum, H. 324, for Easter Tuesday
- Ich war tot und siehe ich bin lebendig, H. 325, for Easter
- Bleibe bei uns denn es will Abend werden, H. 326, for Easter Monday
- Gott aber sei Dank der uns den Sieg gegeben, H. 327, for Easter Monday
- Wende meine Augen ab, H. 328, for the eighth Sunday after Trinity
- Siehe hie bin ich, H. 329, for the third Sunday after Epiphany
- Selig sind die Gottes Wort hören, H. 330, for Sexagesima
- Ich will wiederkommen und euch zu mir nehmen, H. 331, for Ascension
- Der hinunter gefahren ist, H. 332, for Ascension
- Die Liebe Gottes ist ausgegossen in unser Herz, H. 333, for Pentecost
- Ich will meinen Geist ausgießen, H. 334, for Pentecost
- Lehre mich tun nach deinem Wohlgefallen, H. 335, for Pentecost
- Also hat Gott die Welt geliebet, H. 336, for Pentecost Monday
- Ich habe einen Held erwecket, H. 337, for Pentecost
- O Land höre des Herren Wort, H. 338, for Sexagesima

From a series of 12 cantatas copied c.1750:

- O Herr hilf o Herr laß wohl gelingen, H. 339, for the first Sunday of Advent 1738
- Es danken dir Gott die Völker, H. 340, for the second Sunday of Advent 1737
- Siehe da ist euer Gott, H. 341, for the third Sunday of Advent 1740
- Ehre sei Gott in der Höhe, H. 342 (Part II: Der Himmel tönt von Ehrenpsalmen), for Christmas
- Bist willkommen du edler Gast, H. 343, for the second day of Christmas
- Herzlich lieb hab ich dich o Herr, H. 344, for the third day of Christmas
- Nun danket alle Gott, H. 345, for New Year
- Lebt Christus was bin ich betrübt, H. 346, for Easter
- Wo bist du Sonne blieben, H. 347, for Easter Monday

A series of 17 cantatas copied c.1760:

- Saget der Tochter Zion siehe dein Heil kommt, H. 348, for the first Sunday of Advent
- Komm herein du Gesegneter des Herrn, H. 349, for Advent
- Küsset den Sohn daß er nicht zürne, H. 350, for Advent
- Erkennet doch daß der Herr seine Heiligen wunderlich führet, H. 351, for the third Sunday of Advent
- Ehre sei Gott in der Höhe, H. 352, for Christmas 1737
- Ehre sei Gott in der Höhe, for Christmas 1720
- Uns ist ein Kind geboren, H. 353, for the second day of Christmas
- Jauchzet ihr Himmel freue dich Erde, H. 354, for Christmas
- Sehet welch eine Liebe hat uns der Vater erzeiget, H. 355, for the third day of Christmas
- Sind wir denn Kinder so sind wir auch Erben, H. 356, for the third day of Christmas
- Einen andern Grund kann niemand legen, H. 357, for Christmas
- So nimm doch nun Herr meine Seele von mir, H. 358, for Purification
- Ich habe Lust abzuscheiden, H. 359, for Purification
- Der Herr hat Großes an uns getan, H. 360, for New Year
- Gehet zu seinen Toren ein, H. 361, for New Year
- Es danken dir Gott die Völker, H. 362, for Epiphany
- Das ist die Freudigkeit die wir haben zu Gott, H. 363, for the third Sunday after Epiphany

A series of 15 cantatas copied c.1760:

- O Herr dreieiniger Gott, H. 364, for Trinity
- Ach ich fühle keine Reue, H. 365, for the second Sunday after Trinity
- Ach was soll ich Sünder machen, H. 366, for the third Sunday after Trinity
- Du Vater bist voll Güte, H. 367, for the fourth Sunday after Trinity
- Des Herren Segen machet reich, H. 368, for the fifth Sunday after Trinity
- Verleih daß ich aus Herzensgrund, H. 369, for the sixth Sunday after Trinity
- O Herr gib uns ein fruchtbar Jahr, H. 370, for the seventh Sunday after Trinity
- Wie wenig sind der Heilgen dein, H. 371, for the eighth Sunday after Trinity
- Erbarm dich mein o Herre Gott, H. 372, for the ninth Sunday after Trinity
- Nimm von uns Herr du treuer Gott, H. 373, for the tenth Sunday after Trinity
- Wie dürft' ich bitten wenn mein Sinn, H. 374, for the 11th Sunday after Trinity
- Ihn laßt tun und walten, H. 375, for the 12th Sunday after Trinity
- Heil du mich lieber Herre, H. 376, for the 13th Sunday after Trinity
- Wer weiß wie nahe mir mein Ende, H. 377, for the 16th Sunday after Trinity
- Dieses ist ein Spruch des Höchsten, H. 378, for the 18th Sunday after Trinity

From a manuscript containing 14 pieces of church music:

- Lobt ihn mit Herz und Munde, H. 379, for Visitation
- Schreib meinen Nam' aufs beste ins Buch des Lebens ein, H. 380, for St. John's Day
- Stimmt an mit vollen Chören, H. 381, for St. John's Day
- Ich will selbst meine Schafe weiden, H. 382, for Pentecost Tuesday
- Hosianna gelobet sei der da kommt, H. 383, for Palm Sunday
- Das Warten der Gerechten wird Freude werden, H. 384, for Jubilate
- Gelobet sei Gott der mein Gebet nicht verwirft, H. 385, for Rogate
- Ich danke dir daß du mich demütigest, H. 386, for Exaudi
- O Herr laß mich dein Angesicht oft sehen, H. 387, for Cantate
- Wir sind voller Angst und Plag, H. 388, for Exaudi
- Was Gott tut das ist wohlgetan, H. 389, for the second Sunday after Epiphany on "Was Gott tut, das ist wohlgetan"
- Singet und spielet dem Herrn in euren Herzen, H. 390, for the fifth Sunday after Epiphany

Six birthday cantatas for Frederick III:

- Deine Gnade müsse mein Trost sein, H. 391
- Verbirge dein Antlitz nicht für mir, H. 392 (1744)
- Laß meinen Mund deines Ruhmes, H. 393
- Laß meinen Gang gewiß sein, H. 394
- Deine Hand hat mich gemacht und bereitet, H. 395
- Nun merke ich daß der Herr seinen Gesalbten hilft, H. 396

H. 397–442:

- H. 397: Jesu, deine Passion will ich jetzt bedenken
- H. 398: Judas, der Verräter, küßt Jesum
- H. 399: Jesu, der du wollen büßen vor die Sünden aller Welt
- H. 400: Jesus für Pilato steht
- H. 401: Hinweg, ihr irdsche Hindernisse
- H. 402: Kommt, ihr Geschöpfe, kommt herbei
- H. 403: Laß dich erleuchten, meine Seele
- H. 404: Nehmet das Wort an mit Sanftmut
- H. 405: Der Sohn Gottes hat mich geliebt for Misericordias Domini (autograph; 1722–23 cycle)
- H. 406: Gott, wie dein Name ist, so ist auch dein Ruhm (autograph; 1722–23 cycle)
- H. 407: Das ist je gewißlich wahr for the third Sunday after Trinity (autograph; 1722–23 cycle)
- H. 408: Ich freue mich des, daß mir geredet ist
- H. 409: Wünschet Jerusalem Glück
- H. 410: Ich habe nicht meine Gerechtigkeit, die aus dem Gesetz
- H. 411: Du Tochter Zion, freue dich sehr
- H. 412: Der Herr, unser Gott, sei uns freundlich
- H. 413: Ist Gott für mich, so trete gleich alles wider mich
- H. 414: Nicht Übel ihr um Übel gebt
- H. 415: Sprich nur ein Wort, so werd ich leben
- H. 416: O große Lieb', o Lieb' ohn' alle Maßen
- H. 417: Gib uns heut unser täglich Brot
- H. 418: Ach, der Himmel stehet offen
- Aus der Tiefen rufe ich Herr höre meine Stimme, H. 419, for Rogate
- H. 420: Schmecket und sehet, wie freundlich der Herr ist
- H. 421: Lasset uns zu ihm hinausgehen
- H. 422: Und der Herr sprach: Auf, und salbe ihn
- H. 423: Selig sind, die da hungert und dürstet nach der Gerechtigkeit
- H. 424: Was schlafet ihr, stehet auf und betet
- H. 425: Gelobet sei der Herr, mein Hort
- H. 426: Wie lieblich sind deine Wohnungen, Herr Zebaoth
- H. 427: Singet und spielet dem Herrn in eurem Herzen
- H. 428: Lobe den Herren, den mächtigen König der Ehren
- H. 429: Lobe den Herren, den mächtigen König der Ehren
- H. 430: Siehe, ich stehe vor der Tür und klopfe an
- H. 431: Kündlich groß ist das gottselige Geheimnis
- H. 432: Jesu, kröne du das Jahr
- H. 433: Ich habe Lust, zu scheiden
- H. 434: Opfere Gott Dank und bezahle dem Höchsten dein Gelübde
- Gott sei Dank der uns den Sieg gegeben hat, H. 435, for Easter
- H. 436: Bleibe bei uns, denn es will Abend werden for Easter Monday
- H. 437: Mache mich, o Geist der Gnaden, von den Sündenfesseln los for Pentecost Monday
- H. 438: Sei du mein Anfang und mein Ende
- H. 439: Ich will beständig stets an Jesu hängen
- H. 440: Liebster Jesu, deine Liebe findet ihresgleichen nicht
- H. 441: Ich habe meinen König eingesetzt
- H. 442: Aus der Tiefe rufe ich, Herr, zu dir

Mus.ms. 40370 of the Berlin State Library contains 51 cantatas of Stölzel's 10th cycle, 49 of which were written for the liturgical year 1737–38, and two more possibly for the liturgical year 1741-42:

- Christus kommt her von den Vätern, for Annunciation
- Gelobet sei der Herr der Gott Israel, for St. John's Day
- Preiset mit mir den Herrn, for Visitation
- Gelobet sei Gott und der Vater, for the fourth Sunday of Advent
- Gott ist wundersam in seinem Heiligtum, for the first Sunday after Christmas
- Alles was ihr tut mit Worten oder mit Werken, for New Year
- Ich freue mich und bin fröhlich in dir, for the Sunday after New Year
- Lobet den Herrn alle Heiden, for Epiphany
- Herr ich habe lieb die Stätte deines Hauses, for the first Sunday after Epiphany
- Gottes Rat ist wunderbarlich, for the second Sunday after Epiphany
- Gelobet sei der Herr täglich, for the third Sunday after Epiphany
- Freuet euch der Barmherzigkeit Gottes, for Septuagesima
- Nehmet das Wort an mit Sanftmut, for Sexagesima
- Siehe dein König kommt zu dir, for Estomihi
- Gelobet sei der Herr mein Hort, for Invocabit
- Ich danke dir Herr dass du zornig bist gewesen, for Reminiscere
- Dazu ist erschienen der Sohn Gottes, for Oculi
- Danke für alles dem der dich geschaffen, for Laetare
- Ihr Heiligen lobsinget dem Herren, for Judica
- Der Herr wird seinem Volk Kraft geben, for Quasimodogeniti
- Wir dein Volk und Schafe deiner Weide, for Misericordias Domini
- Gelobet sei Gott und der Vater unsres Herrn Jesu Christi, for Cantate
- Singet Gott lobsinget seinen Namen, for Pentecost
- Sehet welch eine Liebe, for Pentecost Tuesday
- Hilf deinem Volk und segne dein Erbe, for Pentecost Monday
- Heilig ist der Herr Zebaoth, for Trinity
- Wohl zu tun und mitzuteilen, for the first Sunday after Trinity
- Schmecket und sehet wie freundlich der Herr ist, for the second Sunday after Trinity
- O wie ist die Barmherzigkeit des Herrn so groß, for the third Sunday after Trinity
- Wer Barmherzigkeit übet, for the fourth Sunday after Trinity
- Gott segnet den Frommen ihre Güter, for the fifth Sunday after Trinity
- Sprich nicht ich will Böses vergelten, for the sixth Sunday after Trinity
- Wenn du 'gessen hast und satt bist, for the seventh Sunday after Trinity
- Die Lehrer werden mit viel Segen geschmückt, for the eighth Sunday after Trinity
- Vergib uns alle Sünde und tue uns wohl, for the ninth Sunday after Trinity
- So wasche nun Jerusalem dein Herz, for the tenth Sunday after Trinity
- Die Opfer die Gott gefallen, for the 11th Sunday after Trinity
- Ich danke dir Gott ewiglich, for the 12th Sunday after Trinity
- Ich danke dir von rechtem Herzen, for the 13th Sunday after Trinity
- Opfere Gott Dank, for the 14th Sunday after Trinity
- Was betrübst du dich meine Seele, for the 15th Sunday after Trinity
- Wir haben einen Gott, for the 16th Sunday after Trinity
- Gott man lobet dich in der Stille, for the 17th Sunday after Trinity
- Bei dem Herrn ist die Gnade, for the 19th Sunday after Trinity
- Gelobet sei der Gott und der Vater, for the 20th Sunday after Trinity
- Ich hoffe darauf dass du so gnädig bist, for the 21st Sunday after Trinity
- Herr ich bin zu geringe, for the 22nd Sunday after Trinity
- Fürchtet Gott ehret den König, for the 23nd Sunday after Trinity
- Des Herrn großer Tag ist nahe, for the 25th Sunday after Trinity
- Ja Herr allmächtiger Gott deine Gerichte, for the 26th Sunday after Trinity (1742?)
- Amen! Ja komm Herr Jesu, for the 27th Sunday after Trinity (1742?)

=== Secular cantatas ===
Parodies are indicated with ",2" or ",3" after the H. WK A number:

- H. WK A 1,1: Volles Vergnügen ausnehmende Freude, for the birthday of Elisabeth Albertine, spouse of Günther I (Sondershausen 15 April 1732)
- H. WK A 1,2: Glücklicher Zustand anmuthiges Leben
- H. WK A 2: Alles Vergnügen auf einmal geneßen, for the birthday of Günther I (Sondershausen 24 August 1737)
- H. WK A 3: Entweicht ihr ungebethnen Sorgen, for the birthday of Elisabeth Albertine (Sondershausen 11 April 1738)
- H. WK A 4: Außnehmender Vortheil vortreffliche Krafft, for Günther I (Sondershausen)
- H. WK A 5: Was herrlich fürtrefflich und prächtig erscheinet, for the birthday of Elisabeth Albertine (Sondershausen 23 April 1737)
- H. WK A 6: Begeisterte Quelle der fürstlichen Liebe, for the birthday of Günther I (Sondershausen 24 August 1734)
- H. WK A 7: Alles was sonst lieblich heißet, Serenata for Günther I (Sondershausen, probably birthday)
- H. WK A 8,1: Nur in dir wohnt mein Ergötzen, for the birthday of Günther I (Sondershausen 24 August 1733)
- H. WK A 8,2: (first parody of H. WK A 8,1)
- H. WK A 8,3: Sonne spiel im reinsten Lichte
- H. WK A 9: Brich herfür in reinsten Schimmer, for Günther I and Elisabeth Albertine (Sondershausen June 1732)
- H. WK A 10: Toback, du edle Panacée
- H. WK A 11: Seyd willkommen, schöne Stunden / Das durch himmlisches Schicksal, for a birthday of Friedrich II (Gotha 1720–32)

16 cantatas for soprano and basso continuo:

- H. WK A 12: Aurora weinete
- H. WK A 13: Die grausame, doch schöne Sylvia
- H. WK A 14: Ein Augenblick ist eine schöne Zeit
- H. WK A 15: Die Rose bleibt der Blumen Königin
- H. WK A 16: Nur vor euch, ihr schönen Augen
- H. WK A 17: Dies ist der Tag, dies ist die Stunde
- H. WK A 18: Kann die Liebe auch erfreuen
- H. WK A 19: Der arme Sylvio
- H. WK A 20: Ihr stillen Seufzer
- H. WK A 21: Ich bin es schon gewohnt
- H. WK A 22: Flieht ihr Schaffe flieht von hinnen
- H. WK A 23: Zu guter Nacht ihr stoltzen Thürme und Palläste
- H. WK A 24: Ja mein Engel dieses Hertzes
- H. WK A 25: Ihr Augen last den Thränen Bächen
- H. WK A 26: Zornge Sterne laßt mich sterben
- H. WK A 27: Von dem Einfluß zweier Sternen hat mein Herze lieben lernen

== Passions, oratorios, masses and other vocal church music ==
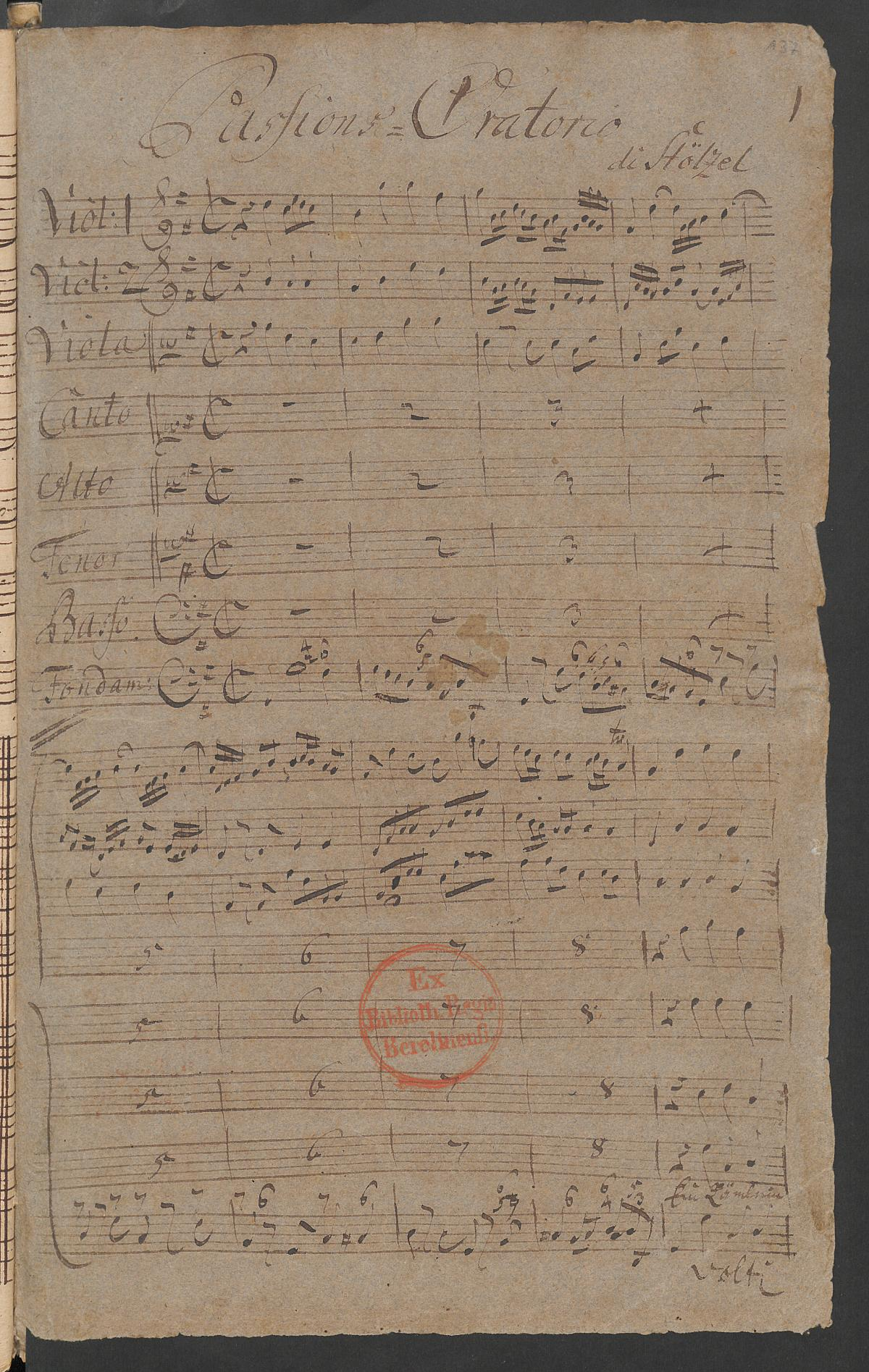
First page of a manuscript copy from around 1750 of Stölzel's Ein Lämmlein geht und trägt die Schuld Passion oratorio (1720)

According to the obituary published by Lorenz Christoph Mizler, Stölzel would have written around fourteen Passions and Christmas oratorios. Stölzel's librettos for his Passions and oratorios approach the cantata format: they are reflective in nature, and lack the dramatic-narrative component of, for instance, a sung Gospel reading.

Passion oratorios premiered on Maundy Thursday and/or Good Friday:

- Die leidende und am Creutz sterbende Liebe Jesu, also known by its incipit Ein Lämmlein geht und trägt die Schuld, in two sections for performance on Maundy Thursday and Good Friday (Gotha 1720, updated version c.1730, and several repeat performances including likely in Sondershausen)
- 1723: Sechs Andachten, aus der von denen vier Evangelisten zusammen getragenen und mit Geistlichen Arien und Choralen untermischten Historie des bitteren Leidens und Sterbens unsers allertheuresten Erlösers Jesu Christi, davon die ersten zwey am Grünen Donnerstage Nachmittage; die andern aber am Char-Freytage, in der Hoch-Fürstl. Schloß-Kirche zum Friedenstein musicalisch ausgeführet worden.
- 30 March 1725: Brockes-Passion (Der für die Sünde der Welt gemartete und sterbende Jesus; Mich vom Stricke meiner Sünden)
- 1727: Jesus als der für das verlohrene Schäflein leidend- und sterbende gute Hirte am Heil. Char-Freytage 1727. In Hoch-Fürstl. Schloß-Kirche zum Friedenstein musicalisch ausgeführet und in gebundene und harmonische Zeilen abgefasset; Jesu frommer Menschenherden, Passion in 4 parts
- 1729: O Welt! sieh hier dein Leben
- 1737: Die mit Buße und Glauben ihren leidenden Jesus bis zum Grabe
- 1745: Sechs geistliche Betrachtungen des leidenden und sterbenden Jesu, aus der Leidens-Geschichte der heiligen vier Evangelisten gezogen; Gründonnerstag, vor und nach der Nachmittags-Predigt, Karfreitag, vor und nach der Vormittags- und der Nachmittags-Predigt. 1745; Jesu deine Passion will ich itzt bedenken, Passion in 6 Betrachtungen.

Christmas oratorios:

- Liebes-Andachten, nach dem Jahrgang aus denen Evangeliis eingerichtet: Und im Hoch-Fürstl. Frieden-steinis. Schloß-Capelle am Weynacht-Fest 1719, musiciret: Cycle of three double (or: six single) cantatas composed for Christmas 1719 in Gotha – probably Stölzel's presentation piece for acquiring the post of Kapellmeister (music lost), with these themes of the reflections, about Christ's love and the response of love of his people, given for the sections:
  1. First day of Christmas (25 December): Die Mensch-werdende Jesus-Liebe – Der Menschen ergebende Gegen-Liebe
  2. Second day of Christmas (26 December): Die predigende Jesus-Liebe – Der Menschen annehmende Gegen-Liebe
  3. Third day of Christmas (27 December): Die eerleuchtende Jesus-Liebe – Der Menschen brennende Gegen-Liebe
- Christmas oratorio performed on the first, second and third day of Christmas 1728 in Gotha, part of Stölzel's 4th cycle, libretto by Stölzel:
  1. 25 December:
    - Zur Epistel (Is. 9:2): Das Volck so im Finstern wandelt, H. 25.
    - Zum Evangelio (Luke 2:11): Euch ist heute der Heyland gebohren
  2. 26 December:
    - Zur Lection (Acts 7:55): Siehe, ich sehe den Himmel offen
    - Zum Evangelio (Is. 59:20): Denen zu Zion wird ein Erlöser kommen
  3. 27 December:
    - Zur Lection (Ps. 119:130): Wenn dein Wort offenbahr wird
    - Zum Evangelio (John 21:17): Herr, du weissest alle Dinge
- Christmas oratorio retroactively constituted from ten cantatas that were performed in Sondershausen from 25 December 1736 to 6 January 1737

Other oratorios (music lost):

- Jesus patiens (Prague, 1716)
- Die büßende und versöhnte Magdalena (Prague, 22 July 1716)
- Caino, overo il primo figlio malvaggio (Prague, 1716)
- Fall und Trost des menschlichen Geschlechts (Gotha, 1724)

Kyrie–Gloria masses (mass compositions consisting of a Kyrie and Gloria exclusively) and other settings of (parts of) the mass:

- Deutsche Messe for SATB voices, strings and continuo (Kyrie and Gloria, words in German; composer's autograph from 1739 extant)
- Kyrie–Gloria Mass in E minor for SATB, 2 oboes, strings and continuo (composer's autograph, from 1725 or later, is extant)
- Missa Canonica (Kyrie and Gloria) in C major:
  - early version for SATB choir and continuo (1725)
  - for two SATB choirs and continuo (composer's autograph, 1725 or later)
  - for "thirteen real voices": two SATB choirs, 2 violin parts, 2 viola parts and bass (earliest manuscript copy from the second half of the 18th century)
- Kyrie–Gloria Mass in C major for SSATB voices and orchestra (1730)
- Kyrie–Gloria Mass in C major for SATB choir and orchestra (copied 1779)
- Kyrie–Gloria Mass in C major for SATB choir and orchestra
- Kyrie–Gloria Mass in E♭ major (autograph 25 April 1745)
- Kyrie–Gloria Mass in F major for SATB voices, two horns, two violin parts and continuo (autograph 2 December 1741)
- Five Kyrie–Gloria Masses in a composite manuscript:
  1. in E♭ major (orchestra including horns, trumpets and timpani)
  2. in F major (orchestra including horns)
  3. in C major (orchestra including trumpets and timpani)
  4. in A minor:
    - Missa In nomine Jesu: Kyrie in A minor for abSATB, two violin parts and continuo (see Kyrie–Gloria Mass in A minor below)
    - Kyrie and Gloria in A minor for SATB voices, two oboes, strings and continuo
  5. in E♭ major (orchestra including oboes and a trumpet; copied by Johannes Ringk in 1756)
- Kyrie–Gloria Mass in A minor for abSATB singers and orchestra; also exists in a version with four vocal soloists
- Kyrie–Gloria Mass in B♭ major (autograph c.1730–1740)
- Kyrie–Gloria Mass in G major (1739; attributed)
- Kyrie–Gloria Mass for SSATB, strings and organ (incomplete)
- Mass in D major for SATB voices, two trumpets, two horns, strings and continuo (copied 1782)
- Mass in D major for SATB voices, two horns, strings and continuo
- Mass in E minor for SATB voices, two oboes, strings and continuo
- Mass in F major for SATB voices and organ
- Kyrie for 13 voices (SSAATTBB singers, four instrument parts and continuo)
- Credo, Sanctus and Agnus Dei
- "Qui tollis peccata mundi suscipe" in D minor and "Cum sancto spiritu, in gloria Dei patris" in F major (attributed)

Other vocal church music:

- German Te Deum (Herr Gott wir danken dir) in D major, probably composed in Bayreuth in 1717
- Ave Regina in D major
- Miserere in G minor
- Offertory Gaudete omnes populi

== Operas ==
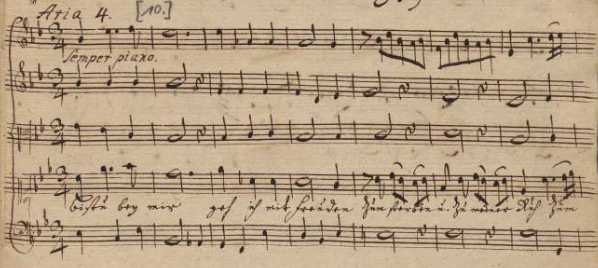
First system of the orchestral version of Stölzel's "Bist du bei mir"

Stölzel is known to have composed 18 operas (music almost entirely lost):

1. Narcissus (Wroclaw 1711)
2. Valeria (Naumburg 1712)
3. Rosen und Dornen der Liebe (Gera, 1713)
4. Artemisia (Naumburg 1713). Surviving arias:
  - "Der holde Strahl, so meine brust entzündet"
  - "Wenn du deinen Schatz wirst küssen"
5. Orion (Naumburg 1713)
6. Venus und Adonis (Prague 1714)
7. Acis und Galathea (= Die triumphierende Liebe, Prague)
8. Das durch Liebe besiegte Glück (Prague)
9. Diomedes (= Die Triumphirende Unschuld, Bayreuth 16 November 1718). Five arias surviving via the archive of the Sing-Akademie zu Berlin:
  - Act II, scene 11: "Es ist die Ursach' meines Leidens"
  - "Geht ihr Küsse geht ihr Blicke"
  - "Mein Glücke steht in deinen Händen"
  - "Bist du bei mir geh ich mit Freuden"
  - "Sage mir doch wertes Glücke"

"Ja ihr angenehmsten Wangen" is an extant aria of the opera Berenice, possibly composed by Stölzel and premiered in Zeitz in 1713.

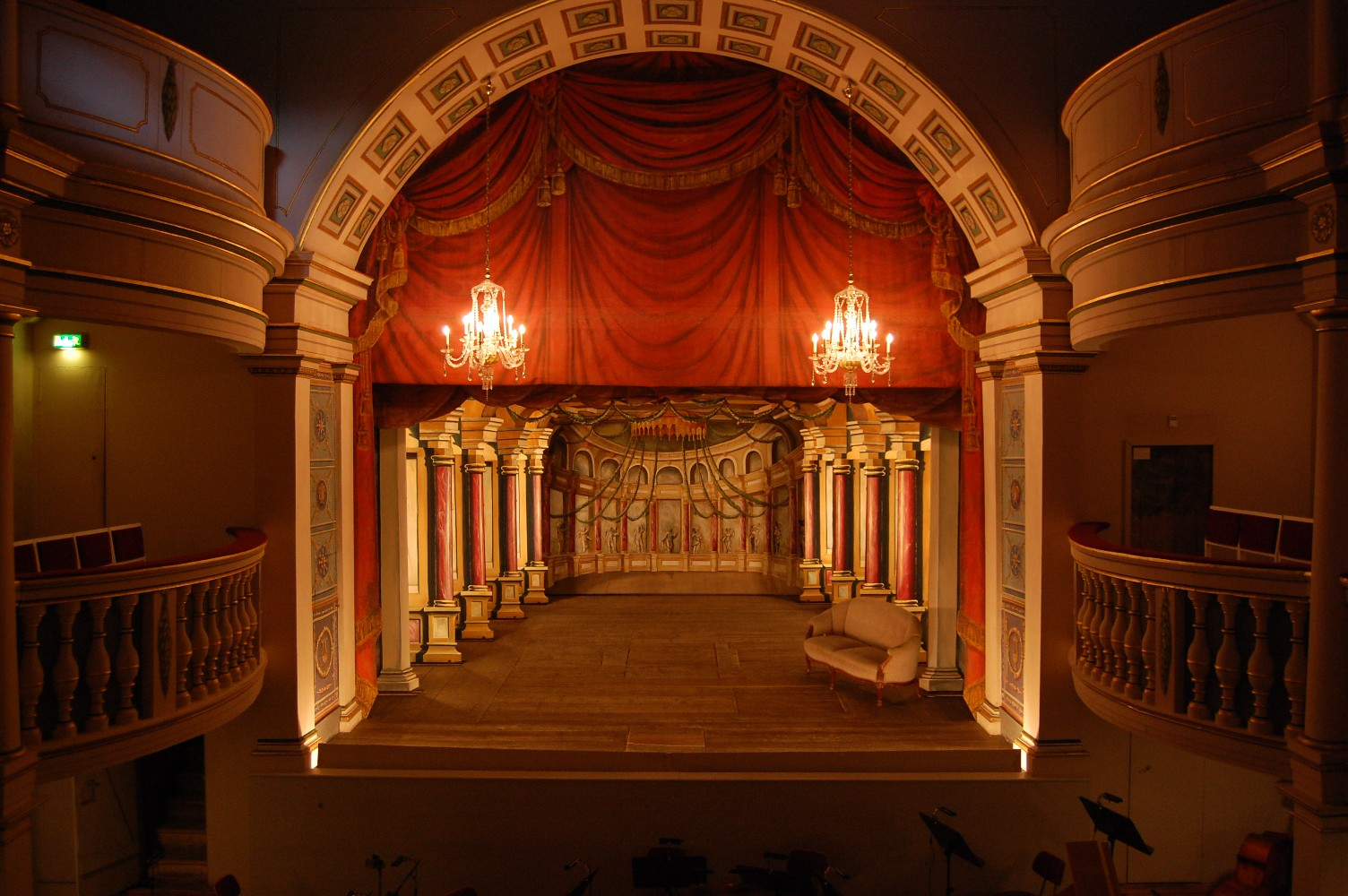
Stage of the Ekhof Theater at Friedenstein Palace

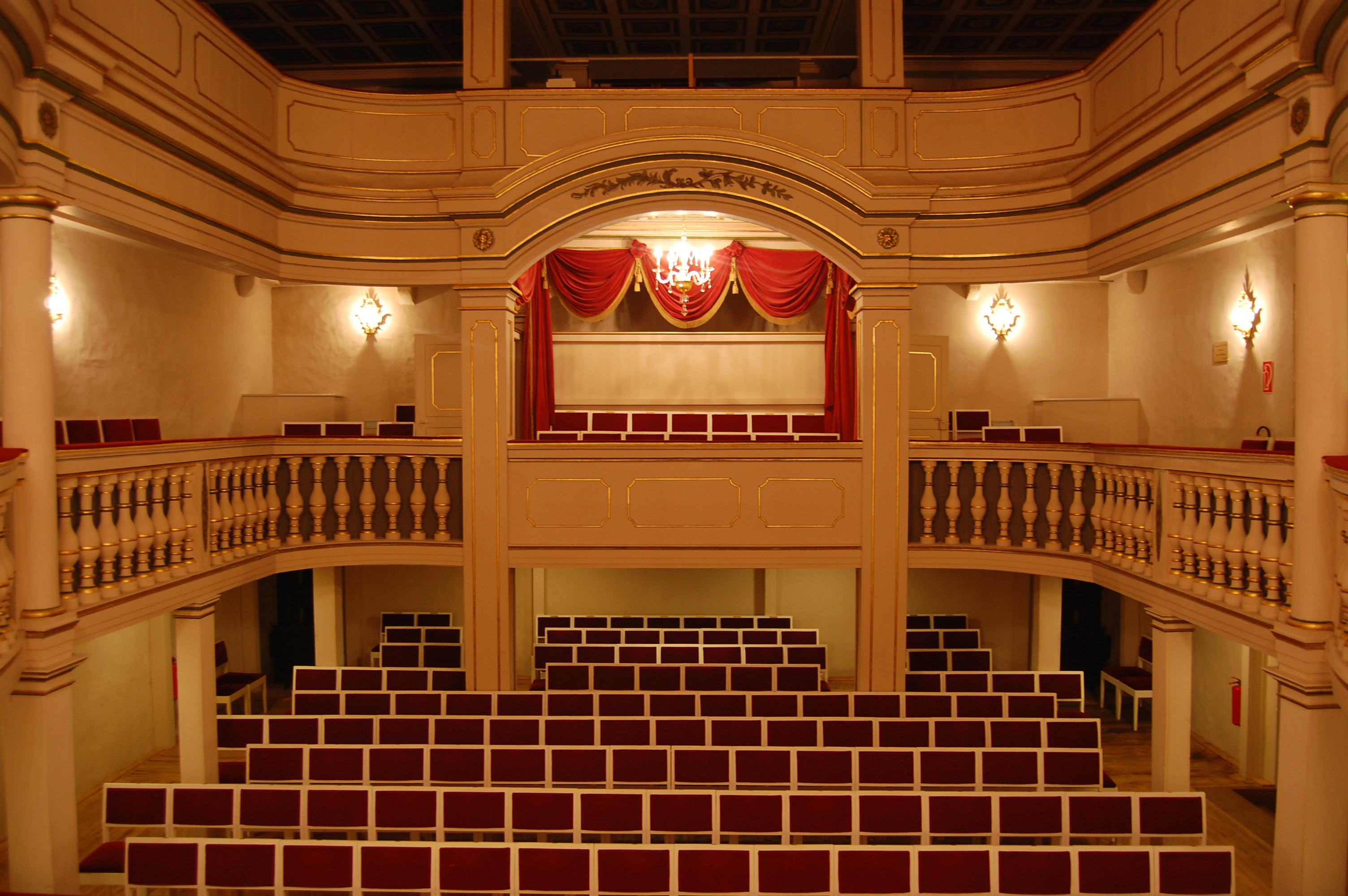
Ekhof Theater, view from stage

Composed in Gotha:

10. Der Musenberg (28 July 1723)
11. Die beglückte Tugend (23 October 1723)
12. Hercules Procidius oder die triumphierende Tugend (1725)
13. Die Ernde der Freuden (= Die Freuden-Ernde, 23 October 1727)
14. Thersander und Demonassa, oder Die glückliche Liebe (1733)
15. L'amore vince l'inganno (1736)
16. Endymion (1740)
17. Die gekrönte Weisheit (1742)
18. Die mit Leben und Vergnügen belohnte Tugend (1744)

Restaged in Gotha:

- Die thriumphierende Liebe (= Acis und Galathea, 1729)
- Adonis (= Venus und Adonis, 1730)
- Narcissus (1734 and 1735)

Some compositions are alternatively indicated as opera or serenata (see also secular cantatas section above):

- Die beschützte Irene, on a libretto by Johann Laurentius Stengel (Altenburg 1722; in 1733 possibly transformed into the serenata Nur in dir wohnt mein Ergötzen, WK A 8,1)

== Instrumental music ==
Several pieces of instrumental music, orchestral as well as chamber music, survived in Dresden, in what is known as "Schrank II" (book-case 2). Most of these manuscripts remained in Dresden and are conserved at the Saxon State and University Library (SLUB). This library made scans of Stölzel's scores available through their website.

Symphonies:

- Sinfonia in E♭ major
- Symphony in D major
- Sinfonia in F major (lost)

Concerti grossi:

- Concerto Grosso a Quattro Chori (D major)
- Concerto grosso in E minor
- Concerto grosso in F major
- Concerto (grosso) in B minor
- Concerto grosso in G major

Concertos with soloists:

- Oboe Concerto in D major
- Oboe Concerto in G minor (à 5)
- Oboe Concerto in E minor
- Oboe Concerto in C major
- Concerto à 5 in G major for oboe d'amore, strings (Vl 1, Vl 2, Va) and continuo (also spuriously attributed to Graun)
- Flute Concerto in E minor (à 4: Flauto trav. Concertato, Violino all'Unisono, Viola con il Fondamento)
- Flute Concerto à 6 (flute, three violin parts, viola and continuo) in G major (GroF 1162, 1219)
- Flute Concerto in G major (GroF 1199)
- Concerto for Oboe and Violin in F major
- Concerto for Flute and Oboe in E minor
- Concerto for Flute and Oboe in B minor (à 5: Flauto traverso Concertato, Oboe Concert., Violino all'unisono, Viola con il Fondamento)
- Concerto á 5 in D major for flute, oboe or flute, strings and continuo (GroF 2202)
- Concerto for Flute and Violin
- Concerto in D major for two oboes d'amore

Eight sonatas in F major for oboe, horn, violin and continuo, from the manuscripts Mus.2450-Q-1 to Mus.2450-Q-5:

- Quadro No. 1
- Quadro No. 2
- Quadro No. 3
- Quadro No. 4
- Quadro No. 5
- Quadro No. 6
- Quadro No. 7
- Quadro No. 8 (Concerto)

A similar sonata for oboe, horn, violin and continuo is kept in the library of the Conservatoire Royal de Bruxelles.

The manuscript Mus.2450-Q-6 contains a trio sonata:

- Trio Sonata in C minor for oboe, violin and harpsichord (continuo)

Twelve trio sonatas in a collective manuscript by multiple scribes:

1. Trio Sonata (No. 1) in C major for organ
2. Trio Sonata (No. 2) in B♭ major for organ
3. Trio Sonata (No. III) in G major for flauto traverso, violin and continuo
4. Trio Sonata (No. 4) in F minor for two unspecified instruments and continuo
5. Trio Sonata (No. V) in E major for two violins and continuo
6. Trio Sonata (No. 5) in C minor for two oboes or two violins, and continuo
7. Trio Sonata (No. 7) in G major for two traversos and continuo
8. Trio Sonata in D major for two traversos and continuo
9. Trio Sonata (No. 8) in E minor for two traversos and continuo
10. Trio Sonata in B♭ major for two unspecified instruments and continuo
11. Trio Sonata in D major for two unspecified instruments and continuo
12. Trio Sonata (No. 3) in E minor for flute, violin and continuo

Two trio sonatas in a collective manuscript:

1. Trio Sonata (No. 3) in F major for two unspecified instruments and continuo
2. Trio Sonata (No. 5) in D major for two unspecified instruments and continuo

Three trio sonatas for violin, flute and harpsichord:

1. Trio Sonata (No. 50) in G major
2. Trio Sonata (No. 51) in D major
3. Trio Sonata (No. 52) in A major

Three trio sonatas copied by "Copyist J. S. Bach I" (=Copyist Anon. 401):

1. Trio Sonata in D major for two unspecified instruments and continuo
2. Trio Sonata in C minor for two oboes or two violins, and continuo (identical to 6th item (No. 5) in 12 sonatas collection)
3. Trio Sonata in F minor for two oboes or two violins, and continuo

Two trio sonatas for violin, flute and continuo:

1. Trio Sonata (No. 1) in G major
2. Trio Sonata (No. 2) in D major

From a manuscript conserved in the Czech Republic (CZ-Pnm XXXIV B 342):

- Trio Sonata in G major for two violins and continuo

Two trio sonatas for two flutes and continuo:

- Trio Sonata in D major
- Trio Sonata in A major

Two trio sonatas for flute, violin and continuo:

- Trio Sonata in G major
- Trio Sonata in E minor

For harpsichord:

- Partita di Signore Steltzeln (No. 48 in the Klavierbüchlein für Wilhelm Friedemann Bach)
- Enharmonische Claviersonate (No. 11, pp. 48–50, in the second volume of Friedrich Wilhelm Birnstiel's Musikalisches Allerley, 1761)
