= Ein Lämmlein geht und trägt die Schuld (Stölzel) =

Christian passion music by Gottfried Stölzel

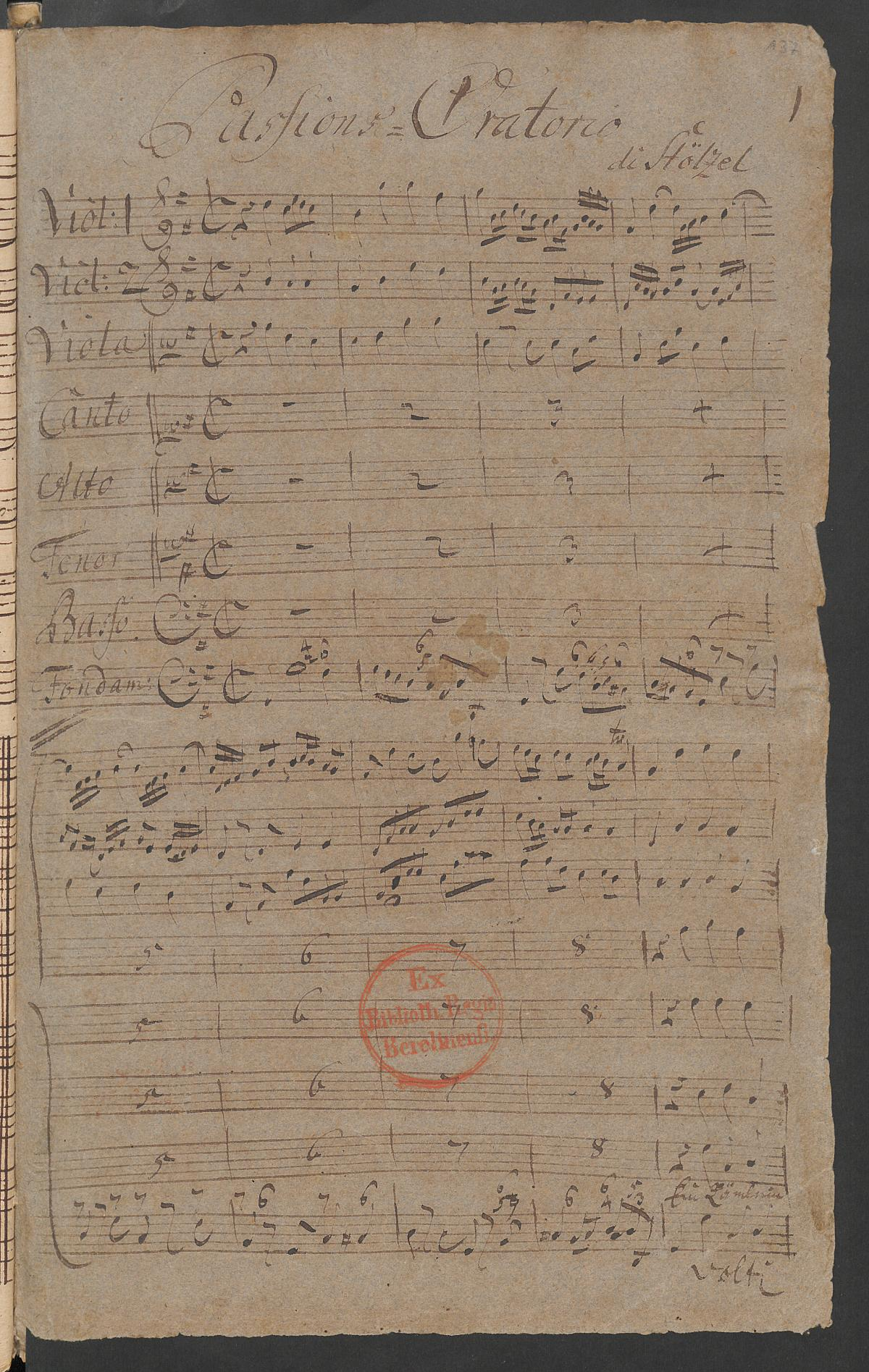
First page of Gottfried Heinrich Stölzel's Ein Lämmlein geht und trägt die Schuld, from a score preserved in Berlin.

Ein Lämmlein geht und trägt die Schuld, also known by the title of its earliest extant printed libretto, Die leidende und am Creutz sterbende Liebe Jesu, is a Passion oratorio by Gottfried Heinrich Stölzel, composed in 1720. Its opening chorus is based on Paul Gerhardt's "Ein Lämmlein geht und trägt die Schuld" and its usual hymn tune, Wolfgang Dachstein's "An Wasserflüssen Babylon" melody.

The Passion oratorio was performed at least half a dozen times in various German cities during the composer's lifetime, and Johann Sebastian Bach reworked one of its arias to a cantata movement (BWV 200). As Markus Rathey has shown, Stölzel's Oratorio inspired Bach in his composition of the Christmas Oratorio, which was performed at the end of 1734.

== History ==
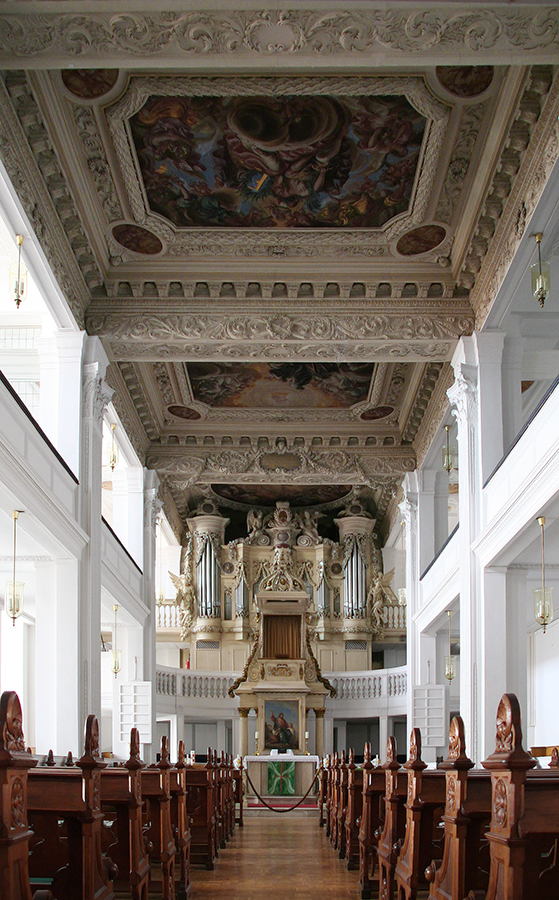
Chapel of Friedenstein Palace in Gotha, where Die leidende und am Creutz sterbende Liebe Jesu was performed for the first time

Gottfried Heinrich Stölzel was already an accomplished composer when he settled in Gotha, where he would remain for the rest of his life, in late 1719. His first large work for that city was a Christmas oratorio consisting of three cantatas, to be performed on three consecutive days in December 1719.

=== Gotha 1720 ===
In 1720, the libretto of Die leidende und am Creutz sterbende Liebe Jesu was printed in Gotha, where the passion oratorio was performed in two parts, on Maundy Thursday and Good Friday.

=== Sondershausen 1730s ===
From 1730, Stölzel provided liturgical music for Sondershausen. The score and parts of Stölzel's performance version of Ein Lämmlein geht und trägt die Schuld, copied in Gotha, survived in Sondershausen, where the Passion oratorio was likely performed more than once in the 1730s.

=== Leipzig 1734 ===
Johann Sebastian Bach performed the Passion oratorio, under the title Der Gläubigen Seele Geistliche Betrachtungen Ihres leidenden Jesu, on Good Friday in 1734.

=== 1736: Rudolstadt and Nürnberg ===
Printed librettos of the Passion oratorio appeared in Rudolstadt and Nürnberg in 1736, indicating performances in both cities in that year.

=== Göttingen 1741 ===
Another printed libretto, published in Göttingen in 1741, mentioning Stölzel as the author of both the libretto and the music, indicates a performance in that city.

=== Berlin manuscript ===
A manuscript copy of the score, derived from the Nürnberg version, is preserved in Berlin and indicates a further 18th-century performance of the Passion oratorio.

== Music and text ==
Stölzel's Passion oratorio is structured as a succession of cantata-like Betrachtungen (contemplations). Typical for Stölzel's oratorios, the text of Ein Lämmlein geht und trägt die Schuld is lyrical and meditative, rather than carried by a dramatic narrative, such as a Bible extract. Stölzel is the author of the Passion oratorio's libretto.

The movements are recitatives followed by arias, and several chorales. The opening chorus is a chorale on Paul Gerhardt's "Ein Lämmlein geht und trägt die Schuld" hymn, set, as usual, to the tune of Wolfgang Dachstein's "An Wasserflüssen Babylon", and enriched with figuration by the strings (Str). The text of the next movement, sung by the Chor der gläubigen Seelen (choir of faithful souls), is free poetry inspired by the Song of Songs, 6:1: "Wohin ist doch mein Freund gegangen?" (Where did my friend go?). Near the end is the only other choral movement set to free poetry, and sung by the Chor der gläubigen Seelen: "Mein Jesus stirbt" is the only elaborate chorus.

The Evangelist enunciates messages in a poetical language, on which the Glaubige Seele (faithful soul) comments in recitatives and arias. Soprano (S), alto (A), tenor (T) and bass (B) take turns in performing the text assigned to the Glaubige Seele: the four voices together form the choir of faithful souls. Obbligato instruments, such as oboe or flute, accompany several arias. The Christliche Kirche (Christian Church), that is the choir, sings the chorales.

Text and/or music of Stölzel's Ein Lämmlein geht und trägt die Schuld can be found in:

- Music manuscript Mus.A15:2 at the Sondershausen city library, which is named after Johann Karl Wezel. Here the Passion oratorio is set "a 11", that is: four voices (SATB), oboe (Ob), flute (Fl), strings (two violin parts and one viola part), and basso continuo (viola da gamba and harpsichord).
- Music manuscript Mus.ms. 21412 III (12) at the Berlin State Library. In this version violin (Vn), two flutes (2Fl), corno (Cr) and bassoon (Bs) perform as instrumental soloists.
- Printed libretto of a 1741 performance of Die leidende und am Creutz sterbende Liebe Jesu in Göttingen.

Movements of Stölzel's Ein Lämmlein geht und trägt die Schuld
Movement	Mus.A15:2	Mus.ms. 21412 III (12)	Libretto Göttingen 1741
Ein Lämmlein geht und trägt die Schuld	1. Choral; G;	Chorus: SATB•Str•Bc;	Die Christliche Kirche
Wohin ist doch mein Freund gegangen	2. Rec., accomp.	Recit., accomp.: SATB•Str•Bc;	Chor der gläubigen Seelen, Evangelist
Ach wo nehm ich Tränen her	3. Aria; g; 2/4	Aria: T•Ob•Str•Bc; 2/4	Gläubige Seele (Aria, D.C.)
Nun was du Herr erduldet	4. Choral; E♭;	Chorale: SATB•Str•Bc;	Christliche Kirche
Jetzt kömmt des Satans Kind Ischarioth	—	—	Evangelist
Ach Jesu soll dich der den du so liebreich	5. accomp.	Recit.: A•Bc;	Gläubige Seele
Darf ich der falschen Welt nicht trauen	6. Aria; F; 2/4	Aria: A•2Fl•Str•Bc; 2/4	Gläubige Seele (Aria, D.C.)
Wenn die Welt mit ihren Netzen	7. Choral; B♭;	Chorale: SATB•Bc;	Christliche Kirche
Ein einzig Wort ich bin's	8. Rec., accomp.	—	—
Ein eintzig Wort so auf der Rotte	—	—	Evangelist
Ach Treuer Seelen-Artzt	—	Recit., accomp.: B•Str•Bc;	Gläubige Seele
Herr und Meister in dem Helfen	9. Aria; e; 3/4	Aria: B•Str•Bc; 3/4	Gläubige Seele (Aria, D.C.)
Ein Arzt ist uns gegeben	10. Choral; C; 3/4	Chorale: SATB•Bc;	Christliche Kirche
Der Heiland fragt hiebei	11. Rec.	—	Evangelist
Auch ich mein Jesu fliehe oft von dir	12. Rec. accomp.	Recit.: S•Bc;	Gläubige Seele
Hirte der aus Liebe stirbt	13. Aria; a; 3/4	Aria: S•Str•Bc; 3/4	Gläubige Seele (Aria, D.C.)
Ich will hier bei dir stehen	14. Choral; F;	Chorale: SATB•Bc; 3/4	Christliche Kirche
Nunmehro wird der Herr gefesselt	15. Rec.	—	Evangelist
Ach daß ihr Augen Quellen wäret	16. accomp.	Recit. (acc.): B•Str•Bc;	Gläubige Seele
Mein nagendes Gewissen	17. Aria; c;	Aria: B•Str•Bc;	Gläubige Seele (Aria, D.C.)
Ach was soll ich Sünder machen	18. Choral; g;	Chorale: SATB•Bc;	Christliche Kirche
Die Ältesten der Hohenpriester	19. Rec.	—	Evangelist
Ach unbeflecktes Gotteslamm	20. accomp.	Recit.: T•Bc;	Gläubige Seele
Ich will schweigen wenn die Welt mir mit List	21. Aria; a; 3/8	Aria: T•Str•Bc; 3/8	Gläubige Seele (Aria, D.C.)
Die Welt bekümmert sich	22. Choral; F;	Chorale: SATB•Bc;	Christliche Kirche
Kaum wird der Morgen wieder neu	23. Rec.	—	Evangelist
O Jesu steh mir an der Seite	24. Rec. accomp.	—	Gläubige Seele
Bei der Größe meiner Sünden	25. Duetto; C;	—	Gläubige Seele (Aria)
Erbarm dich mein in solcher Last	26. Choral; a;	—	Christliche Kirche
Pilatus ist mit dem noch nicht vergnügt	27. Rec.	—	Evangelist
Verdammter Jude hör was hier ein Heide	28. accomp.	—	Gläubige Seele
Mein Jesus soll mein König sein	29. Aria; A;	—	Gläubige Seele (Aria, D.C.)
Ach großer König groß zu allen Zeiten	30. Choral; a;	—	Christliche Kirche
Ach hört das Mordgeschrei der Feinde Jesu	31. Rec.	—	Evangelist
Kannst du o Mittler zwischen Gott und mir	32. accomp.	Recit. accomp.: B•Str•Bc;	Gläubige Seele
Allerhöchster Gottessohn	33. Aria; G; 3/4	Aria: B•Cr•Str•Bc; 6/8	Gläubige Seele (Aria, D.C.)
O Jesu Christ Sohn eingeboren	34. Choral; G; 3/2	Chorale: SATB•Bc; 3/4	Christliche Kirche
Pilatus spricht ich finde keine Schuld	35. (Rec.)	—	Evangelist
O unerhörte Wut o blutiges Verlangen	36. accomp.	Recit.: A•Bc;	Gläubige Seele
Haltet ein ihr Mörderklauen	37. Aria; g; 2/4	Aria: A•Str•Bc; 2/4	Gläubige Seele (Aria, D.C.)
Wie wunderbarlich ist doch diese Strafe	38. Choral; c;	Chorale: SATB•Bc;	[pp. 17ff. unavailable]
Die Geisel ist noch nicht genug	39. Rec.	—	[pp. 17ff. unavailable]
Die Rose in dem Tal	40. accomp.	—	[pp. 17ff. unavailable]
Ach welch ein Mensch bin ich	41. Aria; F;	—	[pp. 17ff. unavailable]
Ich kann's mit meinen Sinnen nicht erreichen	42. Choral; c;	—	[pp. 17ff. unavailable]
Das Volk läßt sich nichts desto minder	43. Rec.	—	[pp. 17ff. unavailable]
So gehet dann der mörderische Wolf	44. accomp.	—	[pp. 17ff. unavailable]
	—	Recit. accomp.: B•Str•Bc;	[pp. 17ff. unavailable]
Meine Sünden heißen dich Seelenfreund	45. Aria; e;	Aria: B•Str•Bc;	[pp. 17ff. unavailable]
Nun ich danke dir von Herzen	46. Choral; C;	—	[pp. 17ff. unavailable]
Ich, ich und meine Sünden	—	Chorale: SATB•Bc;	[pp. 17ff. unavailable]
Nun führen sie den Herrn nach Golgatha	47. Rec.	Recit.: B•Bc;	[pp. 17ff. unavailable]
Mein Heiland sieh ich stell' mich willig ein	48. accomp.	(accomp.): T•Str•Bc;	[pp. 17ff. unavailable]
Dein Kreuz o Bräutigam meiner Seelen	49. Aria; G;	Aria: T•Ob•Vn•Bs•Bc;	[pp. 17ff. unavailable]
Drum will ich weil ich lebe noch	50. Choral; C; 3/2	Chorale: SATB•Bc; 3/4	[pp. 17ff. unavailable]
Ein Haufe Volks folgt Jesu nach	51. Rec.	—	[pp. 17ff. unavailable]
Ach Herr der du um meine Sünden	52. accomp.	—	[pp. 17ff. unavailable]
Wenn der Wollust Lasterkerzen	53. Aria; G;	—	[pp. 17ff. unavailable]
Kaum als der Herr auf seiner Todesbahn	54. Rec.	—	[pp. 17ff. unavailable]
So treibet dein Erbarmen mein Jesu dich	55. accomp.	Recit.: S•Bc;	[pp. 17ff. unavailable]
Hier an diesem Kreuzesstamm	56. [Aria]; b; 3/4	Aria: S•Str•Bc; 3/4	[pp. 17ff. unavailable]
O Lamm Gottes unschuldig	57. Choral; G; 3/2	—	[pp. 17ff. unavailable]
O Lamm Gottes, ohne Schuld	—	Chorale: SATB•Bc;	[pp. 17ff. unavailable]
Pilatus will die Ursach' dieses Tods bekräften	58. Rec.	—	[pp. 17ff. unavailable]
Auch mir mein Jesu bleibt durch deinen Tod	59. accomp.	—	[pp. 17ff. unavailable]
Du hast in deinem Sterben	60. [Aria]; b; 6/8	—	[pp. 17ff. unavailable]
Du führest mich durch deinen Tod	61. Choral; D; 3/2	—	[pp. 17ff. unavailable]
Mariam der ein Schwert durch ihre Seele	62. Rec.	—	[pp. 17ff. unavailable]
Mein Jesu laß auch mich	63. accomp.	—	[pp. 17ff. unavailable]
Kann mein Jesus in dem Tod	64. Aria; a; 6/8	—	[pp. 17ff. unavailable]
Gott ist mein Trost mein Zuversicht	65. Choral; a; 3/2	—	[pp. 17ff. unavailable]
Am Kreuz wird Jesu noch verspottet	66. Rec.	—	[pp. 17ff. unavailable]
Mitleid'ger Jesu ach kann denn das Erbarmen	67. accomp.	—	[pp. 17ff. unavailable]
Ich finde mich beizeit mit Glauben Reu'	68. Aria; D; 2/4	—	[pp. 17ff. unavailable]
In dein Seite will ich fliehen	69. Choral; A;	—	[pp. 17ff. unavailable]
Die Sonne hüllet ihre Strahlen	70. Rec.	—	[pp. 17ff. unavailable]
Du helles Sonnenlicht verstecke deine Pracht	71. accomp.	—	[pp. 17ff. unavailable]
Ich will mit mir selber ringen	72. Aria; A;	—	[pp. 17ff. unavailable]
Weils aber nicht besteht aus eignen Kräften	73. Choral; a;	—	[pp. 17ff. unavailable]
Der Heiland spricht hierauf	74. Rec.	—	[pp. 17ff. unavailable]
Der Vorhang in dem Tempel reißt	75. accomp.	—	[pp. 17ff. unavailable]
Mein Heiland	—	Recit.: T•Bc;	[pp. 17ff. unavailable]
Mein Jesus stirbt Schmerz Jammer Ach	76. Chorus; c;	Tutti:	[pp. 17ff. unavailable]
Ein Kriegsknecht kömmt daher	77. Recit.	—	[pp. 17ff. unavailable]
Des Tempels Vorhang ist entzwei	78. Recit.	—	[pp. 17ff. unavailable]
Kommt	—	Recit. (acc.): T•Ob•Str•Bc;	[pp. 17ff. unavailable]
Jesu wahrer Mensch und Gott	79. Choro; B♭; 2/4	—	[pp. 17ff. unavailable]
O Jesu, du mein Hülff und Ruh	—	Chorale: SATB•Bc;	[pp. 17ff. unavailable]

== Reception ==
Johann Sebastian Bach not only performed Stölzel's Passion oratorio in 1734: he reworked one of its arias, "Dein Kreuz, o Bräutigam meiner Seelen", into Bekennen will ich seinen Namen, BWV 200, which he completed in 1742.

In the 21st century Stölzel's Passion oratorio was programmed in public concerts:

- 25 March 2016: performed in Berlin, by the Lautten Compagney, and singers including the chamber choir of the Sing-Akademie zu Berlin, conducted by Kai-Uwe Jirka.
- 31 March 2018: performed in Cheltenham, by the Corelli Orchestra and Ensemble, conducted by Warwick Cole.
- 20 April 2019: performed in Gotha, by the Rheinische Kantorei, conducted by Hermann Max.

== Sources ==
- Beißwenger, Kirsten (2017). "Other Composers". In Leaver, Robin A. (ed.). The Routledge Research Companion to Johann Sebastian Bach. Taylor & Francis. ISBN 9781409417903.
- Glöckner, Andreas (2009). "Ein weiterer Kantatenjahrgang Gottfried Heinrich Stölzels in Bachs Aufführungsrepertoire?" [Is there another cantata cycle by Gottfried Heinrich Stölzel that belonged to Bach’s performance repertoire?]. In Wollny, Peter (ed.). Bach-Jahrbuch 2009 [Bach Yearbook 2009]. Bach-Jahrbuch (in German). Vol. 95. Neue Bachgesellschaft. Leipzig: Evangelische Verlagsanstalt. pp. 95–115. doi:10.13141/bjb.v2009. ISBN 978-3-374-02749-1. ISSN 0084-7682.
- Schabalina, Tatjana (2008). "Texte zur Music in Sankt Petersburg: Neue Quellen zur Leipziger Musikgeschichte sowie zur Kompositions- und Aufführungstätigkeit Johann Sebastian Bachs" [Texte zur Music in Saint Petersburg: New sources on Leipzig's music history, including on Johann Sebastian Bach's compositional and performatory practices]. In Wollny, Peter (ed.). Bach-Jahrbuch 2008 [Bach Yearbook 2008]. Bach-Jahrbuch (in German). Vol. 94. Neue Bachgesellschaft. Leipzig: Evangelische Verlagsanstalt. pp. 99–122. doi:10.13141/bjb.v2008. ISBN 978-3-374-02668-5. ISSN 0084-7682.
- Scheitler, Irmgard (2004). Battafarano, Italo Michele (ed.). "Ein Oratorium in der Nürnberger Frauenkirche 1699 und seine Nachfolger". Morgen-Glantz (in German) (14). Sulzbach-Rosenberg: Christian Knorr von Rosenroth-Gesellschaft: 179–212. ISBN 3039103911.
- Scheitler, Irmgard (2005). Deutschsprachige Oratorienlibretti: von den Anfängen bis 1730 (in German). Schöningh. ISBN 3506729551.
- Rathey, Markus (2016). Johann Sebastian Bach's Christmas Oratorio: Music, Theology, Culture. Oxford University Press. ISBN 978-0-19-027525-9.
- Stölzel, Gottfried Heinrich (1741). Die leidende und am Creutz sterbende Liebe Jesu, in denen Kirchen der Stadt Göttingen zur Fasten-Zeit vorgestellt (in German). Göttingen: Hager.
- Winterfeld, Carl von [in German] (1847). Der Evangelische Kirchengesang im achtzehnten Jahrhunderte. Der evangelische Kirchengesang und sein Verhältniss zur Kunst des Tonsatzes (in German). Vol. III. Leipzig: Breitkopf & Härtel.
- Wollny, Peter (2008). "Bekennen will ich seinen Namen: Authentizität, Bestimmung und Kontext der Arie BWV 200. Anmerkungen zu Johann Sebastian Bachs Rezeption von Werken Gottfried Heinrich Stölzels" [Bekennen will ich seinen Namen: authenticity, purpose and context of the aria BWV 200. Annotations regarding Johann Sebastian Bach's reception of Gottfried Heinrich Stölzel's works]. Bach-Jahrbuch 2008 [Bach Yearbook 2008]. Bach-Jahrbuch (in German). Vol. 94. Neue Bachgesellschaft. Leipzig: Evangelische Verlagsanstalt. pp. 123–158. doi:10.13141/bjb.v2008. ISBN 978-3-374-02668-5. ISSN 0084-7682.
