= Emanuel Kegel =

German Baroque composer

- Born: 1655; Gotha, Germany
- Died: June 26, 1724 (aged 68–69) Breslau, Poland
- Occupation: Teacher • Composer

Emanuel Kegel (1655 – 23 June 1724) was a German Baroque composer.

Born in Gotha, Kegel was initially music director in Neustadt bei Coburg, then in Gera. He is primarily remembered as the teacher of Gottfried Heinrich Stölzel who was his pupil at Gera from 1703 to 1707.

He died in Breslau.

== Works, editions and recordings ==
Nothing was published during his lifetime.

- Cantata Nichts ist süßer als die Liebe Klaus Mertens, Accademia Daniel, cond. Shalev Ad-El, 2007.
