= Bekennen will ich seinen Namen, BWV 200 =

Arrangement by Johann Sebastian Bach of an aria from Gottfried Heinrich Stölzel

Bekennen will ich seinen Namen (I shall acknowledge His name), BWV 200, is an arrangement by Johann Sebastian Bach of an aria from Gottfried Heinrich Stölzel's passion-oratorio Die leidende und am Creuz sterbende Liebe Jesu. He scored it for alto, two violins and continuo, possibly as part of a cantata for the feast of Purification. He probably led the first performance around 1742.

== History and text ==
Bach arranged in Bekennen will ich seinen Namen an aria, "Dein Kreuz, o Bräutgam meiner Seelen" (Your cross, o bridegroom of my soul" from Gottfried Heinrich Stölzel's passion-oratorio Die leidende und am Creuz sterbende Liebe Jesu. Bach's arrangement, dated around 1742–43, was possibly part of a cantata for the Marian feast of Purification. The prescribed readings for the day were Malachi 3:1–4, and Luke 2:22–32.

Bach likely performed his arrangement in 1742 in Leipzig.

== Music ==
The aria is scored for solo alto voice, two violins, and basso continuo. As with many of Bach's latest cantatas, the aria has a "quality of mellow assurance". It is in adapted ternary form but includes no clear reprise of the opening section. The vocal line includes melismas but no other word painting.

== Recordings ==
- Mechthild Georg, Württembergisches Kammerorchester Heilbronn, Helmuth Rilling. Die Bach Kantate Vol. 7 (BWV 11, 100, 200). Recorded 1984. Hänssler, 1985
- Academy of St Martin in the Fields, Kenneth Sillito. J.S. Bach: Cantatas Nos. 53 · 82 · 170 · 200. Capriccio, 1993.
- Amsterdam Baroque Orchestra, Ton Koopman. J.S. Bach: Complete Cantatas Vol. 21. Antoine Marchand, 2002.
- Bach-Orchester Mainz, Diethard Hellmann. J.S. Bach: Psalm 51 BWV 1083 & Cantata BWV 200. Da Camera, 1966.
- English Baroque Soloists, John Eliot Gardiner. J.S. Bach: Cantatas for the Feast of Purification of Mary. Archiv Produktkion, 2000.
- Netherlands Bach Collegium, Pieter Jan Leusink. Bach Edition Vol. 17. Brilliant Classics, 2000.
- Philomusica of London, Thurston Dart. J.S. Bach: Cantatas BWV 53, BWV 54, BWV 200, BWV 244. L'Oiseau-Lyre, 1958.
- Musica Antiqua Köln, Reinhard Goebel. BWV 200: Aria for contralto, 2 violins and basso continuo Magdalena Kozena Archiv Production 2003

== Sources ==
- Wollny, Peter (2008). "Bekennen will ich seinen Namen: Authentizität, Bestimmung und Kontext der Arie BWV 200. Anmerkungen zu Johann Sebastian Bachs Rezeption von Werken Gottfried Heinrich Stölzels" [Bekennen will ich seinen Namen: authenticity, purpose and context of the aria BWV 200. Annotations regarding Johann Sebastian Bach's reception of Gottfried Heinrich Stölzel's works]. Bach-Jahrbuch 2008 [Bach Yearbook 2008]. Bach-Jahrbuch (in German). Vol. 94. Neue Bachgesellschaft. Leipzig: Evangelische Verlagsanstalt. pp. 123–158. doi:10.13141/bjb.v2008. ISBN 978-3-374-02668-5. ISSN 0084-7682.
