= Deutsche Messe (Stölzel) =

Mass by Stölzel

- Mass by Gottfried Heinrich Stölzel
- Text: Kyrie, Gloria
- Language: German
- Composed: 1739
- Vocal: SATB choir; strings; continuo

Deutsche Messe is a Lutheran mass in C minor by Gottfried Heinrich Stölzel. He set the text of Kyrie and Gloria in German in 1739.

== History ==
Stölzel, a prolific composer of cantatas, wrote the Deutsche Messe for four-part choir, string orchestra and basso continuo in 1739, setting two parts from the mass ordinary in German, suitable for Lutheran church services. It was published by Bärenreiter.
