= Gottfried Heinrich Stölzel =

German composer (1690-1749)

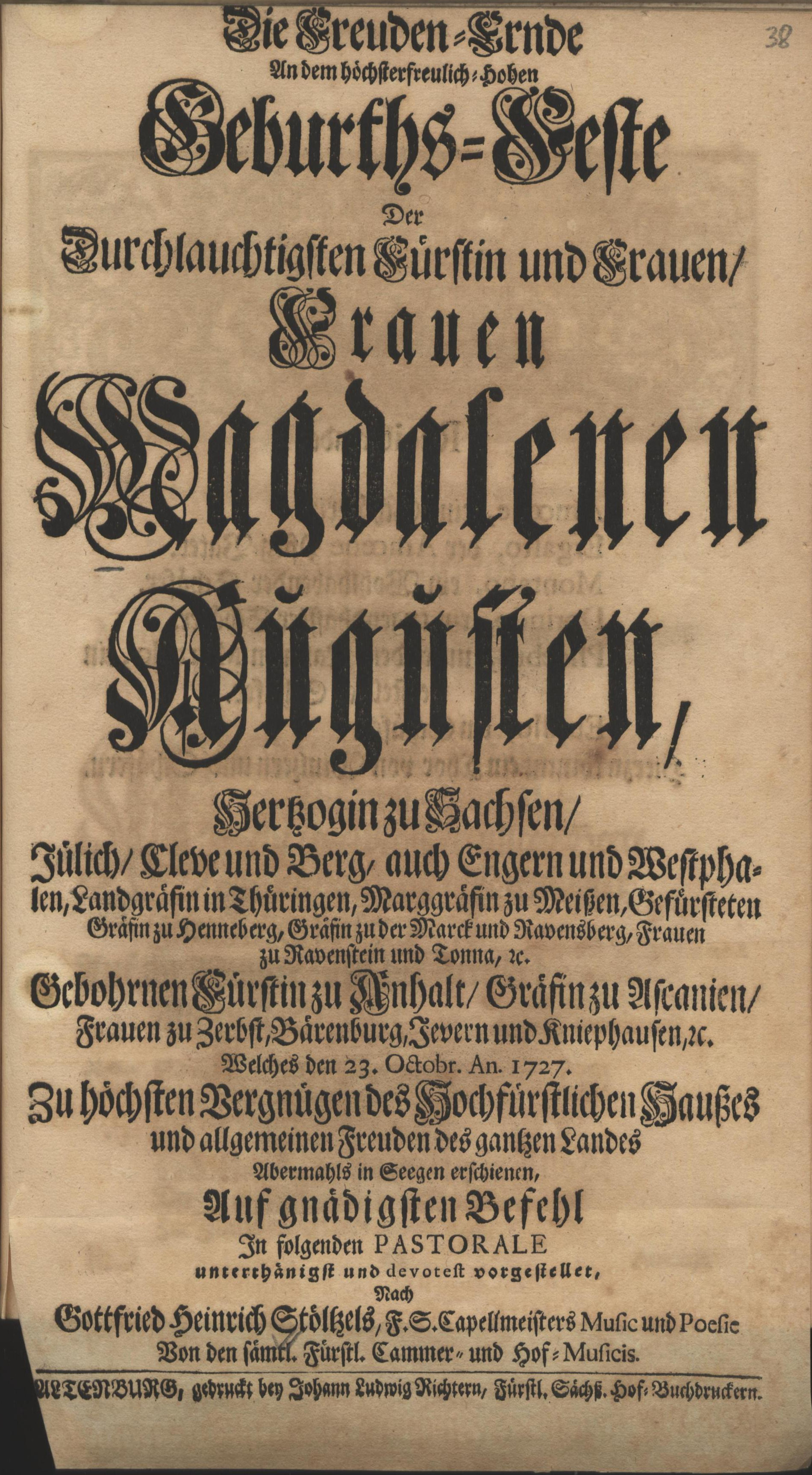
Stölzel composed Die Freuden-Ernde for the 48th birthday of Magdalena Augusta, the wife of his employer Duke Frederick II, (Gotha, 23 October 1727)

Gottfried Heinrich Stölzel (13 January 1690 – 27 November 1749) was a German composer of the Baroque era.

== Biography ==
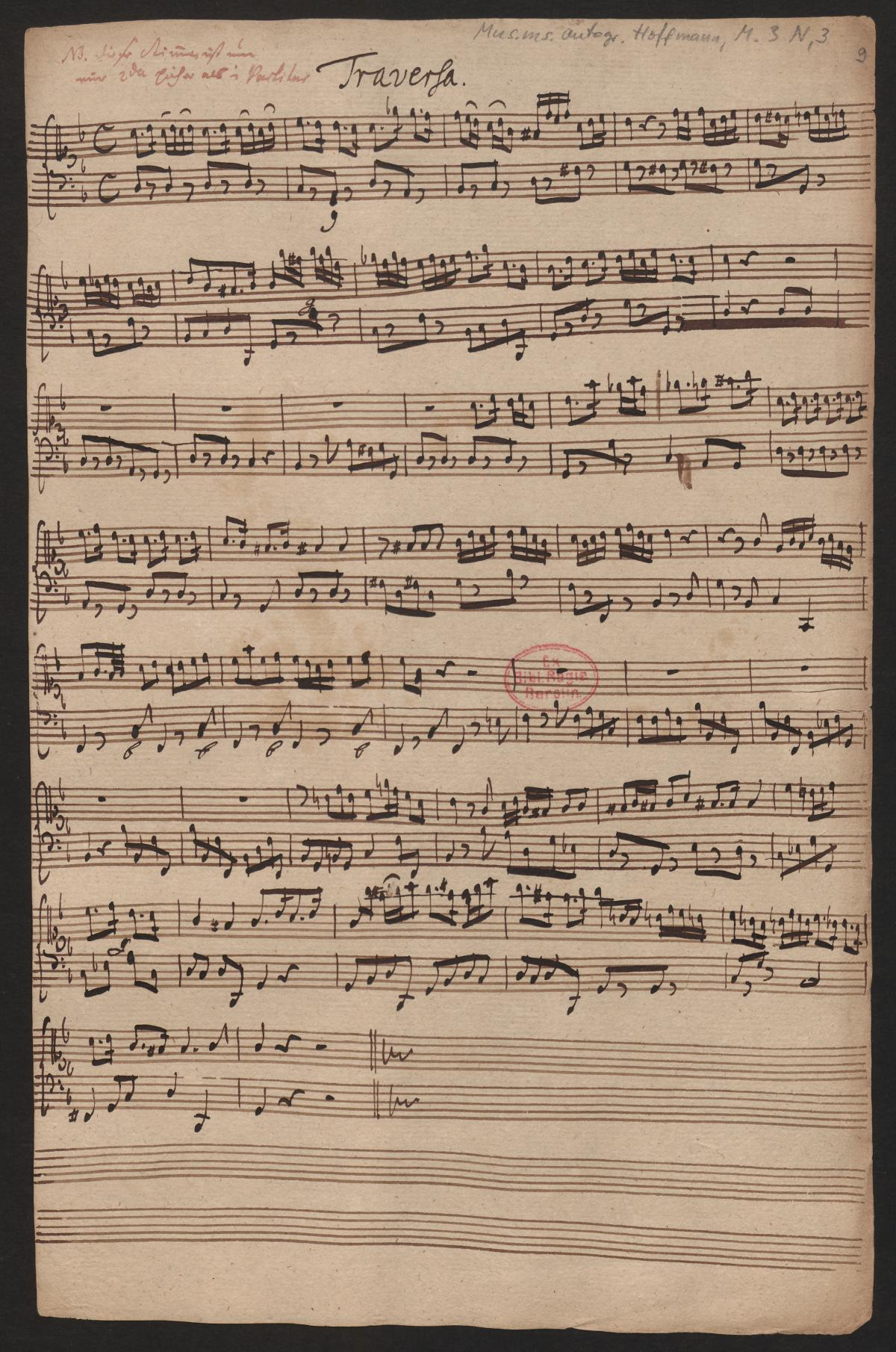
Early 18th-century manuscript copy of the "Traversa" part of Melchior Hoffmann's 1707 Magnificat in A minor (BWV Anh. 21, formerly attributed to Bach): this copy was likely written by a young Stölzel.

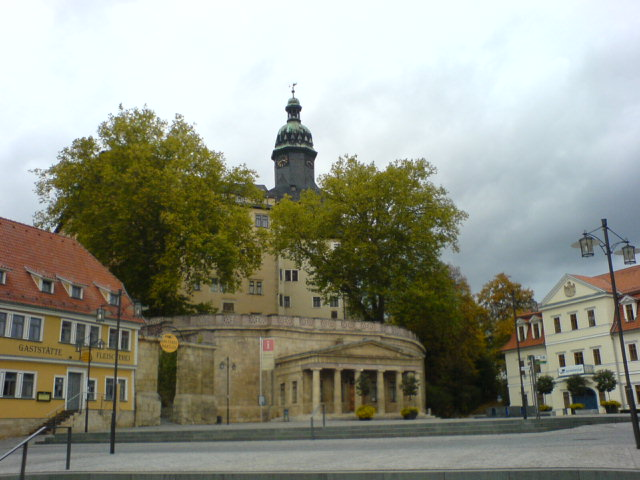
Sondershausen Palace and Market Square

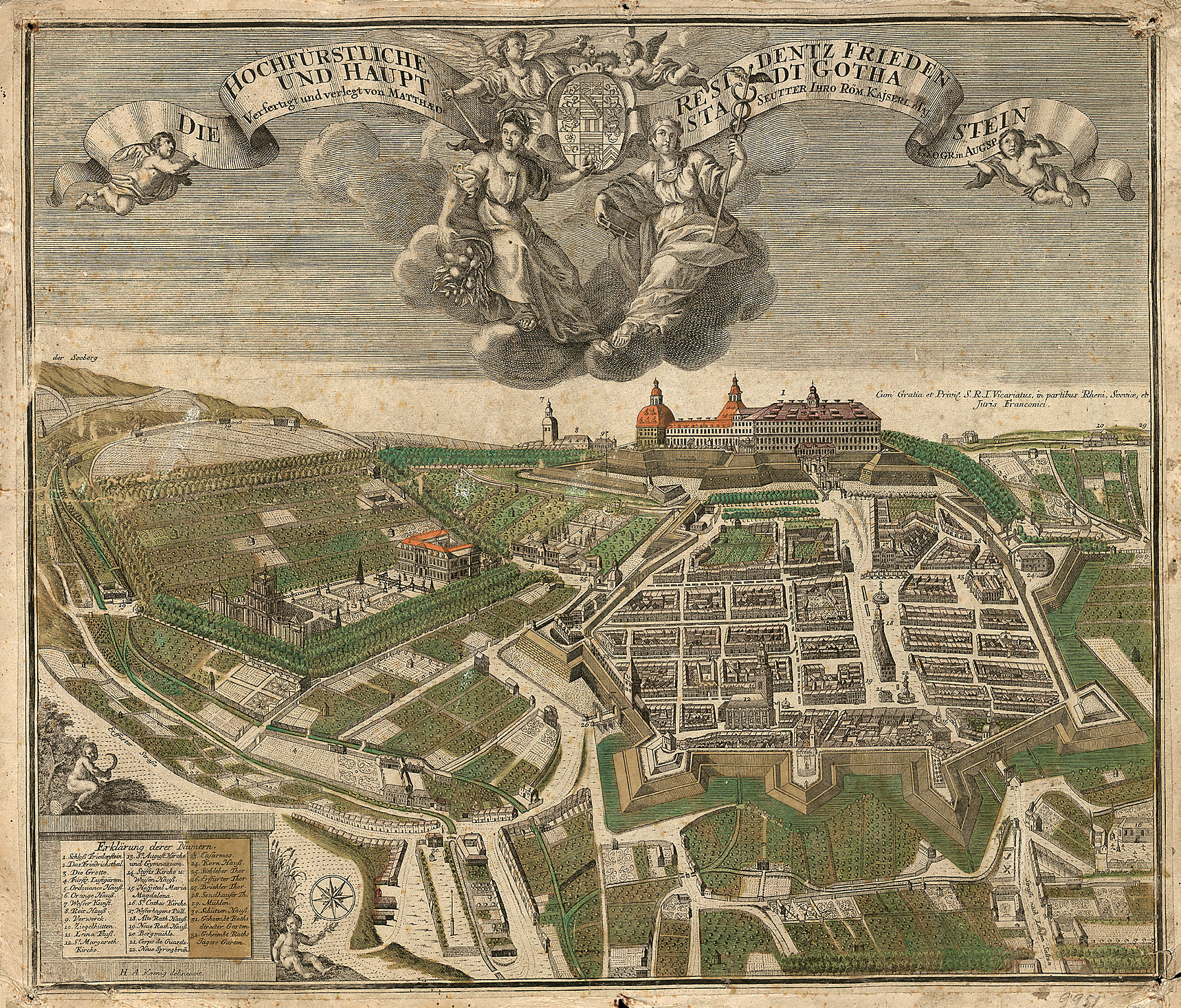
Gotha, with Schloss Friedenstein, c. 1730

=== Early life ===
Stölzel was born in Grünstädtel in the Electorate of Saxony on 13 January 1690. His father, organist in Grünstädtel, gave him his first music education. When he was thirteen, he was sent to study in Schneeberg, where he was taught music, including thoroughbass, by cantor Christian Umlaufft, a former student of Johann Kuhnau. A few years later he was admitted to the gymnasium in Gera, where he further practiced music under Emanuel Kegel, the director of the court chapel. Some of his educators took a dim view of music, and tried to divert his attention from it: apart from engaging in poetry and oratory, Stölzel nonetheless continued to develop his interest in music.

In 1707 he became a student of theology in Leipzig. The city had a lot to offer from a musical point of view: its opera had been reopened shortly before, which Stölzel liked to visit. He became acquainted with Melchior Hoffmann, at the time music director of the Neukirche and conductor of the Collegium Musicum, both in succession of Georg Philipp Telemann, who had left Leipzig in 1705. Perfecting his art under Hoffmann, Stölzel also acted as his copyist, and started composing: initially Hoffmann performed these compositions as his own, Stölzel gradually coming to the open as their composer.

=== As a composer ===
In 1710 Stölzel went to Breslau in Silesia, where his first opera, Narcissus, on his own libretto, was performed in 1711. Returning to Halle after over two years in Silesia, he composed the operas Valeria, instigated by Johann Theile, for Naumburg, and Rosen und Dornen der Liebe for Gera. In 1713 he composed two further operas on his own librettos, Artemisia and Orion, both premiered in Naumburg.

Late in 1713 he travelled to Italy, where he met composers like Johann David Heinichen and Antonio Vivaldi in Venice, Francesco Gasparini in Florence and Domenico Scarlatti and Antonio Bononcini in Rome. Returning after more than a year, he spent some time in Innsbruck, and travelled over Linz to Prague where he worked for nearly three years (1715–17).

In 1715 the post of Kapellmeister at the court of Schwarzburg-Sondershausen became vacant. Stölzel applied, but Prince Christian William I promoted Johann Balthasar Christian Freißlich, the court organist, to Kapellmeister in 1716. Court musicians such as Johann Christoph Rödiger felt disappointed with their master's choice.

In Prague Stölzel premiered three more operas, several oratorios, masses, and many instrumental compositions. Stölzel was for a short time court Kapellmeister in Bayreuth (1717–18) and in Gera (1719). His opera Diomedes was premiered in 1718 in Bayreuth. Stölzel married Christiana Dorothea Knauer on 25 May 1719. They had nine sons and one daughter. Three sons died at a young age.

On 24 November 1719 Stölzel assumed the position of Kapellmeister at the court in Gotha, where he worked under the dukes Frederick II and Frederick III of Saxe-Gotha-Altenburg until his death in 1749.

Stölzel wrote several theoretical works about music, but only one of these was published during his lifetime: a treatise on the composition of canons, of which 400 copies were printed in 1725.

In 1720 Prince Günther I succeeded his father in Sondershausen. He too regretted his father's choice for the court Kapellmeister. He asked Stölzel to provide music for the court chapel. However, Stölzel did not comply with this request until 1730, when Freißlich was leaving for Danzig (where he was appointed in 1731). Until Günther's death in 1740 Stölzel provided music for the Sondershausen court, which included four cycles of church cantatas, other sacred music, and secular music such as serenatas.

In 1739 Stölzel became a member of Lorenz Christoph Mizler's Society of Musical Sciences. As a member of this Society he composed a cantata and wrote a treatise on the recitative, which was published as Abhandlung vom Recitativ in the 20th century.

=== Final years ===
The last two years of his life Stölzel suffered from ill health, becoming feeble-minded ("im Haupte schwach"). Some of Stölzel's manuscripts were sold to cover expenses. He died 27 November 1749 in Gotha, less than 60 years old. Mizler printed Stölzel's obituary as second of three (of which Johann Sebastian Bach's was the third), in the fourth volume of his Musikalische Bibliothek, the organ of the Society of Musical Sciences.

== Compositions ==
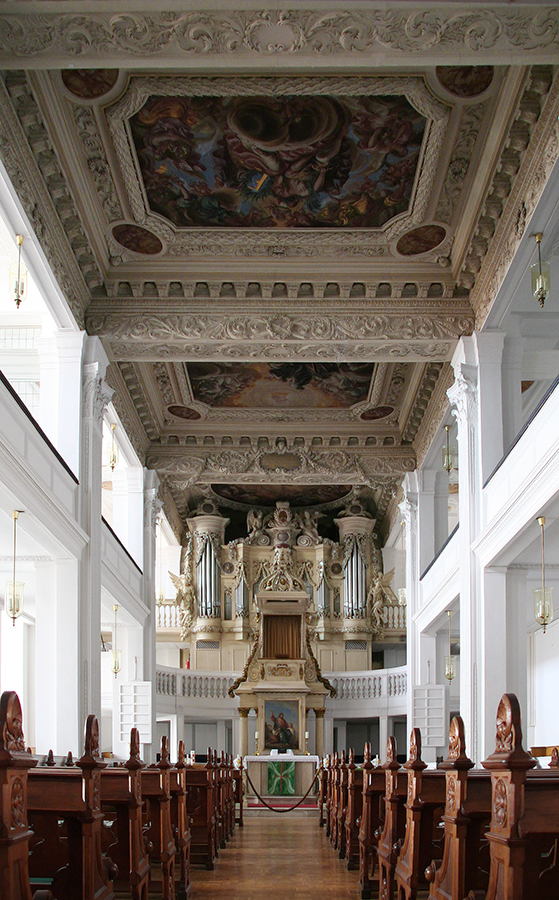
Court chapel of Friedenstein Palace, where, from late 1719, most of Stölzel's sacred music was first performed

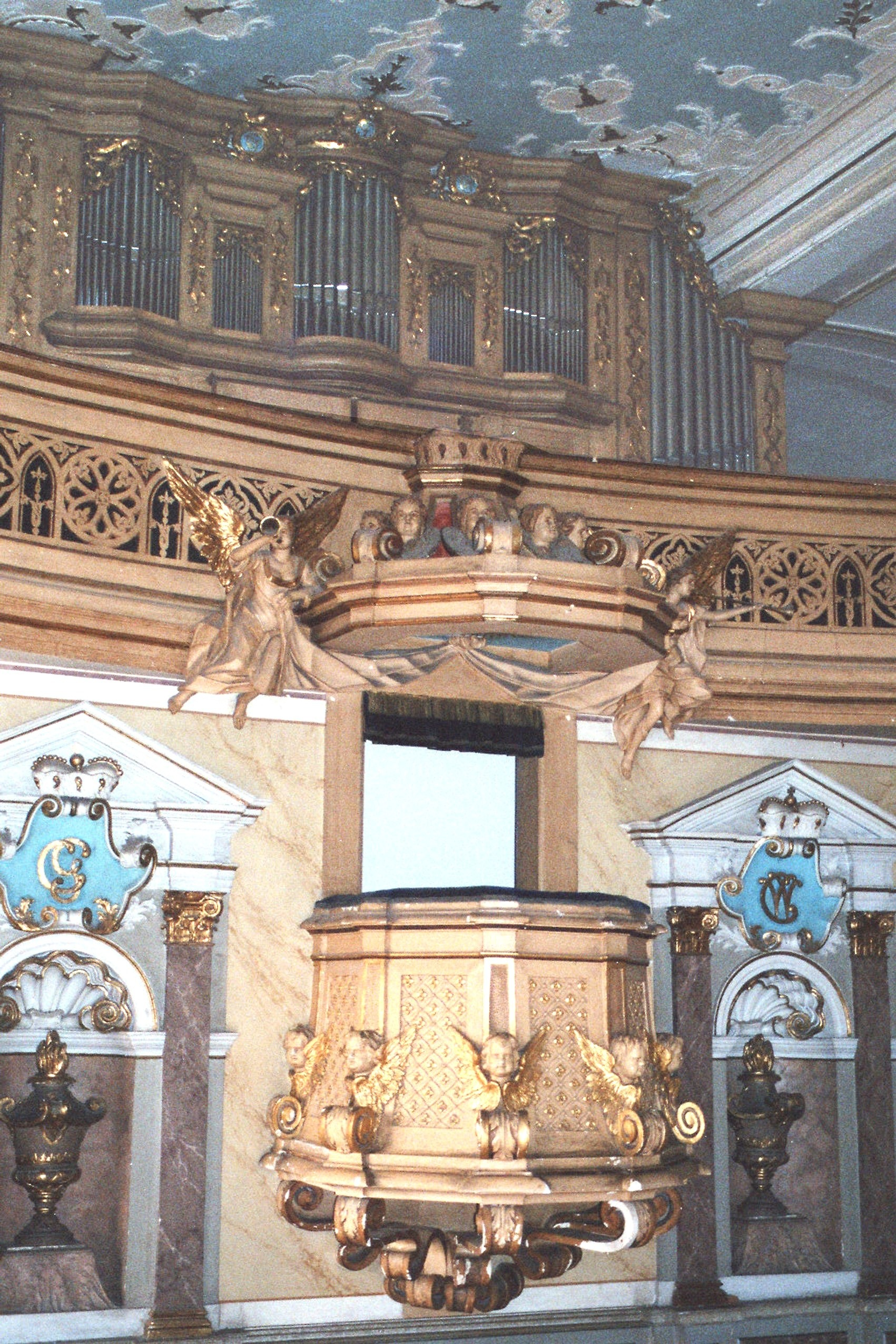
Court chapel of Sondershausen Palace

According to an 18th-century source Stölzel would have composed eight double cantata cycles.

Stölzel composed twelve complete annual cycles of sacred cantatas, which amounts to 1,358 cantatas. 1,215 of these are at least partially extant, 605 surviving with music. Additionally, Stölzel set cantatas to secular texts.

Among his extant compositions are a Brockes Passion of 1725, two Christmas Oratorios, made of cantatas, and a Deutsche Messe (German Mass), a Lutheran Mass consisting of Kyrie and Gloria, in German, set for four-part choir, strings and basso continuo. Extant instrumental works include four concerti grossi, many sinfonias, and a concerto for oboe d'amore. He also wrote for organ and harpsichord.

His five operas, Diomedes (1718), Narcissus, Valeria, Artemisia, and Orion, have not survived. Stölzel is reputed to have composed over 18 orchestral suites alone (none survive), as well as 90 serenatas (vocal pieces performed as "table music").

Half of Stölzel's output, never engraved, is lost. Out of what had to have been thousands of compositions in Gotha, only twelve manuscripts survive there today. The archive at Schloss Sondershausen retains many of his manuscripts, found in a box behind the organ in 1870.

== Reception ==
Stölzel enjoyed an outstanding reputation in his lifetime. Shortly after his death some of his compositions were still performed, and Friedrich Wilhelm Marpurg rated him slightly above Bach in his list of prominent composers of the 18th century. By the 19th century he was largely forgotten. From the second half of the 20th century there was an increase of musicological research about the composer, and recordings of his work.

=== Contemporaries ===
Before he settled in Gotha for the last thirty years of his life Stölzel had already seen his music performed from Germany to Italy. His operas had been staged in several major cities in the 1710s. His sacred music was performed from Catholic Prague to the Protestant German principalities. Even after his music production became concentrated on Gotha and Sondershausen, his music was still performed outside these places. One of his operas was performed in Altenburg in 1722, the Saitenspiel cantata cycle was performed under Johann Friedrich Fasch in Zerbst in 1724–25, and the first Passion he had composed for Gotha, and reworked around 1730, was taken up in several German cities:

- Johann Sebastian Bach performed Ein Lämmlein geht und trägt die Schuld on Good Friday 23 April 1734 in Leipzig.
- In 1736 the Passion was performed as Geistliche Und Heilige Betrachtungen der Gläubigen Seele über Ihren Leidenden und Sterbenden Jesum in Rudolstadt, and in a similar version (Der Glaubigen Seele geistliche Betrachtungen Ihres leidenden Jesu) in Nürnberg.

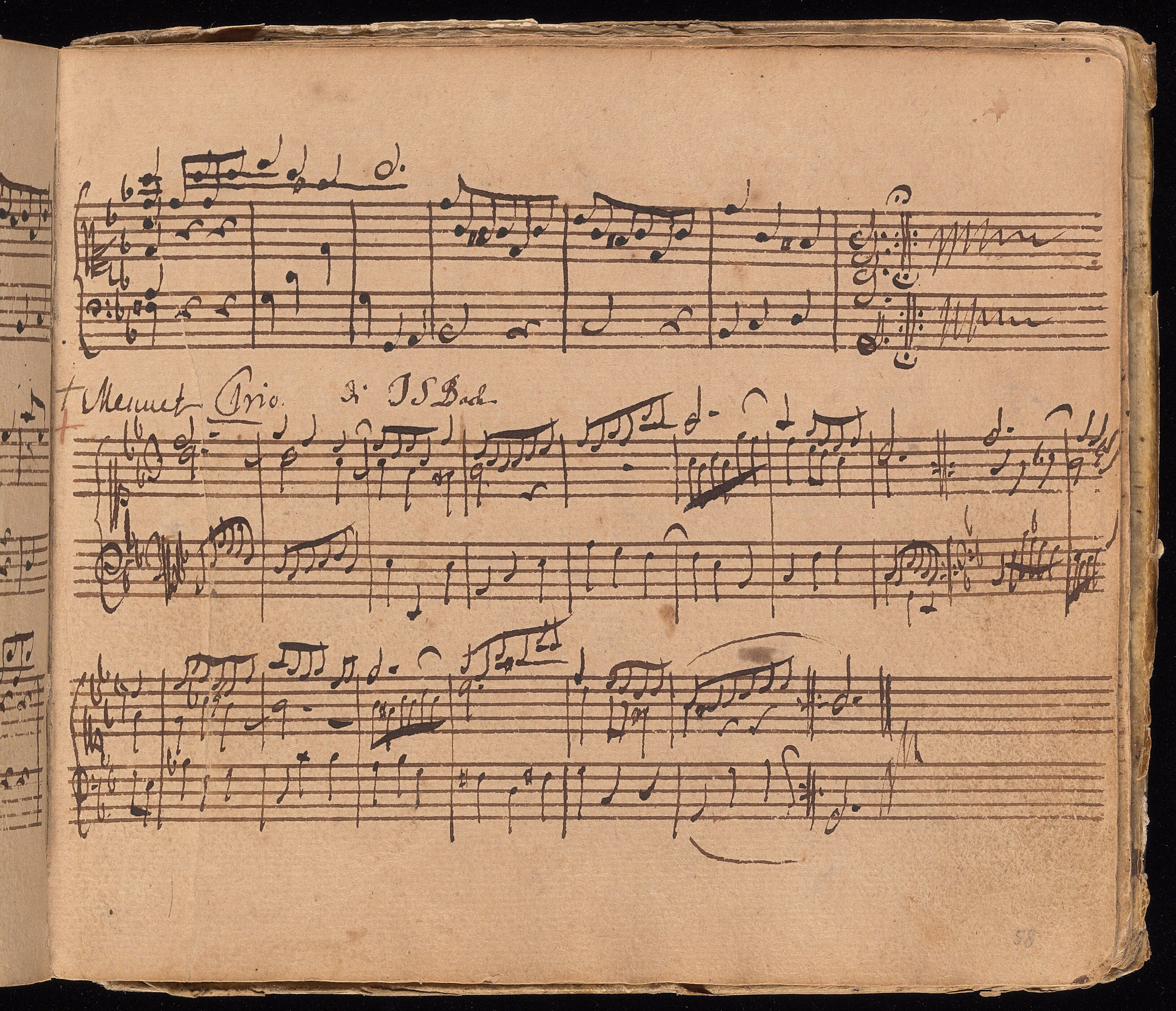
Page 58r of the Klavierbüchlein für Wilhelm Friedemann Bach, written by J. S. Bach, containing the end of Stölzel's Partia and Bach's complement to its last movement (BWV 929).

"Bist du bei mir"
Performed by soprano Elisabeth Schumann, 1934

Bach didn't only perform the work: around 1742–43 he reworked the aria "Dein Kreuz, o Bräutgam meiner Seelen" from Die leidende und am Kreuz sterbende Liebe Jesu into Bekennen will ich seinen Namen, BWV 200. The music of this work had originally been believed to have been Bach's own.

Before that, Bach and his family had shown their interest in various genres of Stölzel's music:

- Klavierbüchlein für Wilhelm Friedemann Bach: in the 1720s Bach copied a four-movement harpsichord suite Partia di Signore Steltzeln (Partita by Mr. Stölzel) as 48th piece in the Klavierbüchlein (keyboard-booklet) of his eldest son Wilhelm Friedemann, adding a Trio (BWV 929) of his own hand to its last movement, a Minuet.
- Possibly in the period 1732–35 Bach performed cantatas of Stölzel's Namebook cycle in Leipzig.
- From the first Sunday after Trinity 1735 to Trinity Sunday the next year Bach probably performed Stölzel's entire String-Music cantata cycle in Leipzig's churches. Text booklets containing Schmolck's librettos and the chorales Stölzel had added to his settings of these librettos, were printed for the Leipzig church services in that period.
- Notebook for Anna Magdalena Bach: some time after 1733–34 Anna Magdalena Bach noted "Bist du bei mir", BWV 508, based on the aria "Bist du bei mir geh ich mit Freuden" from Stölzel's opera Diomedes, in her notebook. For a long time the music of this aria was misattributed to her husband Johann Sebastian.

Johann Mattheson reckoned Stölzel among "the level-headed, learned, and great music masters" of his century. Lorenz Christoph Mizler rated Stölzel as great as Johann Sebastian Bach.

=== Next generation ===
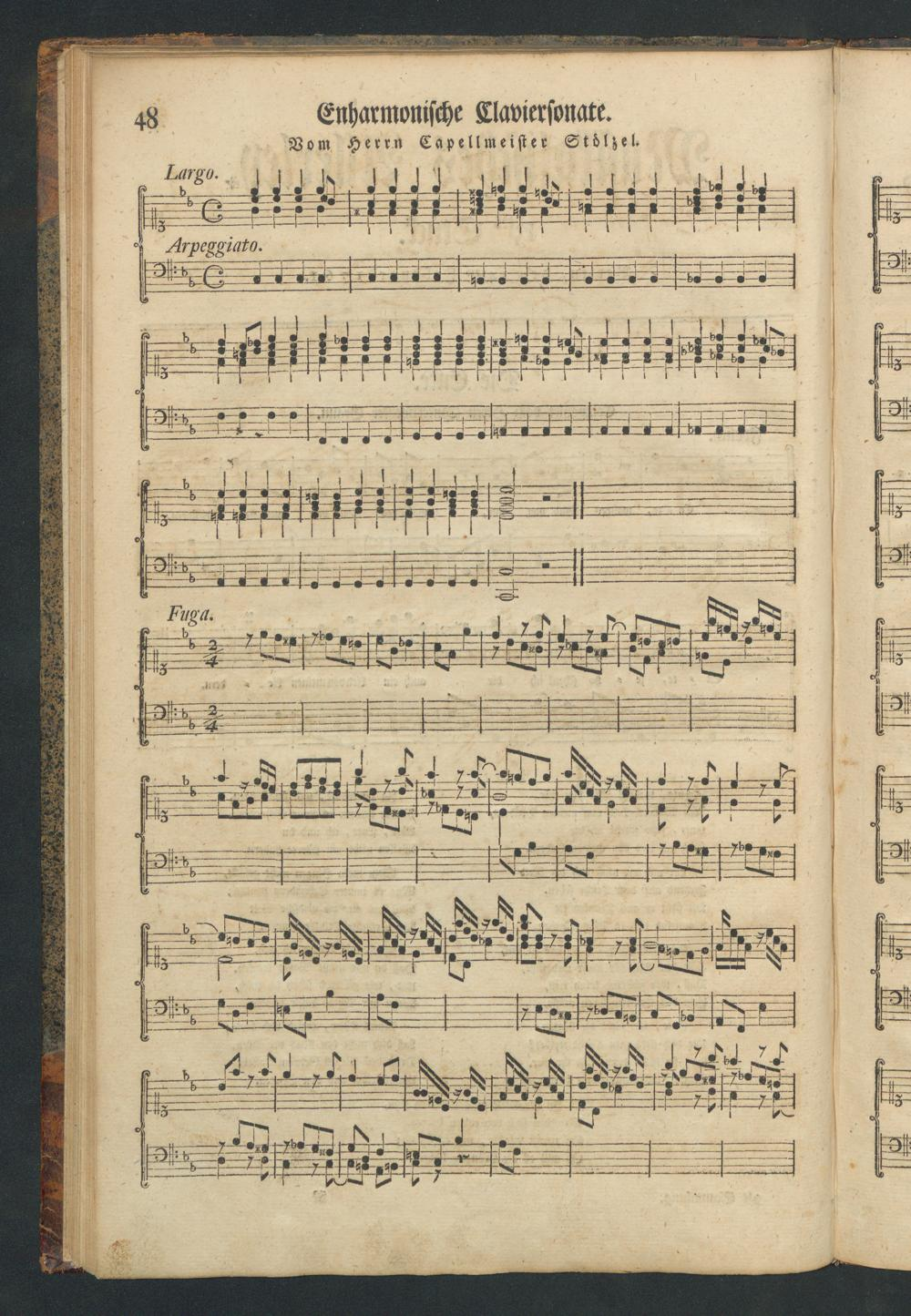
In 1761 Friedrich Wilhelm Birnstiel published Stölzel's Enharmonische Claviersonate (enharmonic keyboard sonata) in the second volume (13th instalment) of his Musikalisches Allerley.

Georg Benda, Stölzel's immediate successor at the court in Gotha, restaged church music of his predecessor, sometimes with score revisions, until 1768: Passion settings and many cantatas such as the 1728–29 double cantata cycle (restaged in the liturgical years 1752–53, 1763–64 and 1765–66) were included in such repeat performances. Stölzel's legacy was however disintegrating through sales of manuscripts, which court musicians had continued after the composer's death. In 1778 Benda wrote: "... Only the best works of my predecessor, which could be used even today for church music, are saved, because already a long time ago I separated them from useless junk and kept them in my own house."

Through Benda's neglect manuscripts of Stölzel's works in Gotha were lost. In Sondershausen Stölzel's works were copied, performed and conserved. Surprisingly Johann Gottlob Immanuel Breitkopf did not list any church cantatas by Stölzel in his catalogues of 1761, 1764 and 1770. Johann Kirnberger considered Stölzel to be one of the greatest contrapuntists, and illustrated his Die Kunst des reinen Satzes with music by Stölzel. C. P. E. Bach adopted several movements of Stölzel's Sechs geistlichen Betrachtungen des leidenden und sterbenden Jesus in his 1771 Lukas-Passion and his 1772 Johannes-Passion pasticcios. After C. P. E. Bach's death in 1788 three of Stölzel's cantata cycles were found in his legacy.

Reference works by Johann Adam Hiller (1784) and Ernst Ludwig Gerber (early 1790s) contain biographies of Stölzel. Hiller describes part of Stölzel's music production as "heard today and forgotten tomorrow": over-all light in spirit and, according to the standards of the time when these pieces originated, with pleasurable singing lines over a sparse instrumental accompaniment. Hiller qualifies Stölzel's choral music as full in texture and rich in harmony, and names the Canonic Mass in thirteen real voices and the German Te Deum as examples of Stölzel's accomplished style, fully mastering the composition of canons and fugues. Gerber largely repeats Hiller's biographical notes and judgement about Stölzel's music, adding descriptions of Stölzel's 1736 double cantata cycle and vocal chamber music, where the singing voice is treated as an instrumental part, in some passages rather an accompaniment than the leading voice. Gerber praises Stölzel for his art of composing recitatives and summarizes the content of the then still unpublished Abhandlung vom Recitative.

=== Manuscript conservation and publications ===
Georg Pölchau collected manuscripts of Stölzel's music, many of these ending up in the Berlin State Library. Pölchau edited Stölzel's Missa canonica for thirteen real voices for publication in 1818. Pölchau offered a copy of this edition to Carl Friedrich Zelter, leader of the Sing-Akademie zu Berlin. In 1832 Pölchau published a selection of Stölzel's choral music. In the first half of the 19th century one of Stölzel's masses was copied by Johann Gottfried Schicht, and, with the orchestral part arranged for organ by Carl Ferdinand Becker, performed in Leipzig. Becker also arranged some of Stölzel's music for organ solo.

The pieces from the Anna Magdalena and Wilhelm Friedemann Bach notebooks, "Bist du bei mir" and Partita di Signore Steltzeln, were published by the Bach Gesellschaft in the second half of the 19th century. Stölzel's solo cantata Die Rose bleibt der Blumen Königin was published in 1884. Arnold Schering published Stölzel's Concerto Grosso a quattro Chori in 1907. The aria BWV 200 was first published, as a composition by Johann Sebastian Bach, in 1935. The trio sonata in F minor for 2 violins or oboes and basso continuo was published in 1937. In 1938 Wolfgang Schmidt-Weiss wrote a thesis about Stölzel's instrumental music, which was published as a book in 1939.

The 1940s and 1950s saw a number of score publications:

- In 1942 a trio sonata for flute, violin and continuo was published.
- In 1948 Merseburger published the cantata Aus der Tiefe rufe ich (H. 442).
- A Sonata for oboe, horn, violin and continuo was published around 1952.
- The Concerto for Oboe, strings & continuo in D major was published in 1953, with a piano reduction by G. Müller.
- Hans Albrecht prepared the Christmas cantata Kündlich gross ist das gottselige Geheimnis for publication in 1953, and edited the chorale and aria Lob und Dank for publication in 1954.
- A trio sonata for Flute, Violin and Harpsichord was published in 1955.
- Around the mid-1950s Josef Bachmair edited two trio sonatas for two violins and continuo: the Sonata V and the Sonata in B♭ major.
- Around the same time Gotthold Frotscher published the trio sonatas in D major for flute, violin and continuo, and in G major for two flutes and continuo.

The New Bach Edition republished the three Bach-related pieces in the second half of the 20th century. The Concerto for Oboe and Violin in F major was published in 1963. In the 1970s Jean Thilde published, in a series named after Maurice André, several compositions of the baroque era in an arrangement for trumpet, including, by Stölzel, the D major oboe concerto (1972), the F major double concerto (in 1975 with a piano reduction of the orchestral material and in 1976 with the orchestral score), a sonata in D major after the "Sonata V" for two violins (1976), a concertino in E minor (1976), a concerto in C (1976), and a concerto in B♭ (1976).

In 1965 Fritz Hennenberg wrote a two-volume thesis about Stölzel's cantatas. In 1976 an updated version of that thesis was published in one volume as Das Kantatenschaffen von Gottfried Heinrich Stölzel. An Urtext edition of the G minor Oboe Concerto was published in 1979. The cantata Ich bin beide was published in 1981. Stölzel's O wie ist die Barmherzigkeit des Herrn so groß was published in 1989. Two sonatas, Nos. 3 and 4 of the eight sonatas à quattro for oboe, violin, horn and basso continuo collection, were published in 1993. Hofmeister published the fifth Sonata à Quattro for oboe, violin, horn and basso continuo in 2001.

Stölzel's Ave Regina, Sind wir denn Kinder, Ehre sei Gott, and a new edition of the 1725 cantata Kündlich groß ist das gottselige Geheimnis were published in 2003. Stölzel's 1725 setting of the Brockes-Passion was also published in the first decade of the 21st century. The 1772 St. John Passion pasticcio which included four movements by Stölzel was published as Vol. 7.1 in Series IV of C. P. E. Bach's complete works. The German Te Deum was published in 2010.

In the 21st century facsimiles of large portions of Stölzel's work became available on websites such as those of the Berlin State Library and the Saxon State and University Library Dresden.

=== Recordings ===
The vocal music that was published as part of the Bach legacy is frequently recorded:

- "Bist du bei mir" is by far Stölzel's most often recorded piece of music.
- BWV 200 has been recorded over 20 times since 1951.

Dietrich Fischer-Dieskau recorded the cantata Aus der Tiefe rufe ich, Herr, zu Dir, H. 442, in the early 1950s, and again, for Deutsche Grammophon, in 1965. Erik van Nevel, conducting the Ricercar Consort, recorded this cantata in 1991. Günter Wand recorded the Concerto grosso a quattro chori in 1956. Carl Schuricht's performance of the work at the Salzburger Festspiele was recorded in 1961.

Maurice André performed the D major Oboe Concerto as a trumpet concerto, and recorded it several times, for example in the 1960s for Philips, in 1977 with the English Chamber Orchestra conducted by Charles Mackerras, and in 1983 with the Academy of St. Martin-in-the-Fields conducted by Neville Marriner. In 1971 he recorded Stölzel's Concerto Grosso a Quatri Chori with five other trumpetists, Pierre Pierlot on the oboe and the Jean-François Paillard Chamber Orchestra conducted by Philippe Caillard. In 1980 André recorded the Sonata in D major, reconstructed and orchestrated by Thilde after Stölzel.

André Bernard's recording of the D major trumpet concerto appeared in 1973. The Ricercar Consort recorded and released the Sonata à 4 of the Brussels Conservatory in 1988.

Stölzel's Brockes Passion, in a performance conducted by Ludger Rémy, was recorded in 1997.

Rémy also recorded ten (half) cantatas from the Christmas season 1736–37 in Sondershausen, released as Christmas Oratorio on two CDs:

- CD 1 (recorded May 1999):
  - for the first day of Christmas:
    - Ach, dass die Hülfe aus Zion über Israel käme
    - Ehre sei Gott in der Höhe
  - for the second day of Christmas:
    - Ich sehe den Himmel offen
    - Ihr sollt nicht wähnen
  - for the third day of Christmas:
    - Kündlich gross ist das gottselige Geheimnis
- CD 2 (recorded January 2000):
  - for the Sunday after Christmas:
    - Das Alte is vergangen
    - Das Ende eines Dinges ist besser denn sein Anfang
  - for New Year's Day:
    - Alles, was ihr tut mit Worten oder Werken
  - for Epiphany:
    - Danksaget dem Vater
    - Wir haben ein festes prophetisches Wort

Rémy's recordings of the 16 chamber cantatas H. WK A 12–27 were released on two CDs, in 2002 and 2004 respectively.

C. P. E. Bach's 1772 Johannes-Passion pasticcio, containing some movements by Stölzel, was recorded in 2003.

Rémy's Cantatas for Pentecost CD was released in 2004, containing:

- Three double cantatas for the Pentecost season of 1737:
  1. Werdet voll Geistes
  2. Siehe da, eine Hütte
  3. Wollte Gott, dass alle das Volk
  4. Daran ist erschienen die Liebe
  5. So denn ihr, die ihr arg seid
  6. Lehre mich tun nach deinem Wohlgefallen
- Cantata Er heisset Friedefürst for Quasimodogeniti Sunday 20 April 1732

Two CDs recorded by the Handel's Company conducted by Rainer Johannes Homburg contained the Epistle cantatas and the Gospel cantatas of the 1728 Christmas Oratorio respectively, along with a selection of other works by Stölzel:

- Epistle Cantatas CD (released 2005):
  - Epistle cantatas from the 1728 Christmas Oratorio:
    1. Das Volk, so im Finstern wandelt
    2. Ich sehe den Himmel offen
    3. Wenn dein Wort offenbar wird
  - Other works included in the recording:
    - Concerto for Oboe, Strings and Basso Continuo in D major
    - Deutsche Messe
    - Cantata Kündlich groß ist das gottselige Geheimnis
- Gospel Cantatas CD (released 2007):
  - Te Deum
  - Gospel cantatas from the 1728 Christmas Oratorio:
    1. Euch ist heute der Heiland geboren
    2. Denen zu Zion wird ein Erlöser kommen
    3. Herr, du weissest alle Dinge
  - Cantata Gehet zu seinen Toren ein for New Year

Rémy recorded the serenatas Alles, was sonst lieblich heisset (H. WK A 7) and Seid wilkommen, schöne Stunden (H. WK A 11) in 2007.

The first decade of the 21st century saw new recordings, and reissues of older recordings, of the Concerto grosso a quatro chori and of the Trumpet Concerto in D major. Lajos Lencsés recorded Stölzel's oboe concerto in G minor in 2008.

The nine Quadros (Sonatas à 4) for oboe, horn, violin and continuo were recorded in 2008. A recording of the version for two trumpets of the F major concerto was released in 2015.

Chamber music for string instruments and continuo was recorded in 2009:

- Sonata in C minor for two violins and basso continuo
- Sonata a 4 in G major for violin, viola, violoncello and basso continuo
- Sonata in B flat major for two violins and basso continuo
- Quadro in E minor for two violins, violoncello and basso continuo
- Sonata in D major for two violins and basso continuo
- Sonata in E minor for two violins and basso continuo
- Quadro in G major for two violins, violoncello and basso continuo

The Partia di Signore Steltzeln has been recorded, with inclusion of Bach's Trio BWV 929, on harpsichord, piano and organ. The Enharmonische Claviersonate has been recorded on harpsichord.

== Sources ==
- (in German) Christian Ahrens. Zu Gotha ist eine gute Kapelle ...: Aus dem Innenleben einer thüringischen Hofkapelle des 18. Jahrhunderts. Stuttgart, 2009
- (in German) Ernst Ludwig Gerber. "Stoelzel (Gottfried Heinrich)", columns 585–593 in Historisch-biographisches Lexikon der Tonkünstler, Vol. 2 (N–Z). Leipzig: Breitkopf, 1792.
- Glöckner, Andreas (2009). "Ein weiterer Kantatenjahrgang Gottfried Heinrich Stölzels in Bachs Aufführungsrepertoire?" [Is there another cantata cycle by Gottfried Heinrich Stölzel that belonged to Bach’s performance repertoire?]. In Wollny, Peter (ed.). Bach-Jahrbuch 2009 [Bach Yearbook 2009]. Bach-Jahrbuch (in German). Vol. 95. Neue Bachgesellschaft. Leipzig: Evangelische Verlagsanstalt. pp. 95–115. doi:10.13141/bjb.v2009. ISBN 978-3-374-02749-1. ISSN 0084-7682.
- (in German) Fritz Hennenberg. Das Kantatenschaffen von Gottfried Heinrich Stölzel. Volume 8 of Beiträge zur musikwissenschaftlichen Forschung in der DDR. Leipzig, 1976
- (in German) Johann Adam Hiller. "Stölzel (Gottfried Heinrich)", pp. 256–266 in Lebensbeschreibungen berühmter Musikgelehrten und Tonkünstler neurer Zeit, Vol. 1. Leipzig: Dyk, 1784.
- Kenyon, Nicholas (2011). The Faber Pocket Guide to Bach. Faber & Faber. ISBN 9780571272006.
- (in German) Johann Mattheson (editor). Grundlage einer Ehren-Pforte. Hamburg: 1740, with following contributions by and/or about Stölzel:
  - Pp. 102–103: "Hartig (ex liter. Stölzel.)" (biographical notes on Freiherr von Hartig, whom Stölzel knew during his stay in Prague 1715–17)
  - Pp. 117–119: "Melch. Hofmann (ex lit. Stölzel.)" (biographical notes on Melchior Hofmann, whom Stölzel knew when he studied in Leipzig from 1707)
  - Pp. 171–172:"Logi (ex liter. Stölzel.)" (biographical recollections on Duke von Logi, whom Stölzel knew in Prague)
  - Pp. 342–347: "Stöltzel (ex autogr.)" and "fortsetzung, in form eines Briefes, vom 7. Dec. 1739" (Stölzel's autobiographical notes)
  - P. 382: "Umlaufft (ex lit. Stölzel.)" (Stölzel's short biographical note on Christian Umlaufft, a former teacher of his)
  - P. 406: Stölzel mentioned by Georg Gebel as living in Brieg in 1709
- (in German) Lorenz Christoph Mizler (editor). "VI. Denkmal dreyer verstorbenen Mitglieder der Societät der musikalischen Wissenschafften; B.", pp. 143–157 in Lorenz Christoph Mizler's Musikalische Bibliothek, Volume IV Part 1. Leipzig, Mizlerischer Bücherverlag, 1754.
- Samantha Owens, Barbara M. Reul, Janice B. Stockigt Music at German Courts, 1715-1760: Changing Artistic Priorities. Boydell & Brewer, 2011 (reprint 2015). ISBN 9781783270583
- Pfau, Marc-Roderich (2008). "Ein unbekanntes Leipziger Kantatentextheft aus dem Jahr 1735: Neues zum Thema Bach und Stölzel" [An unknown Leipzig cantata text publication from the year 1735: News regarding Bach and Stölzel]. In Wollny, Peter (ed.). Bach-Jahrbuch 2008 [Bach Yearbook 2008]. Bach-Jahrbuch (in German). Vol. 94. Neue Bachgesellschaft. Leipzig: Evangelische Verlagsanstalt. pp. 99–122. doi:10.13141/bjb.v2008. ISBN 978-3-374-02668-5. ISSN 0084-7682.
- (in German) Irmgard Scheitler. Deutschsprachige Oratorienlibretti: von den Anfängen bis 1730. Schöningh, 2005. ISBN 3506729551
- (in German) Wolfgang Schmidt-Weiss. Gottfried Heinrich Stölzel als Instrumentalkomponist. Würzburg-Aumühle: Triltsch, 1939.
- (in German) Benjamin Schmolck. Das Saiten-Spiel des Hertzens, Am Tage des Herrn, Oder Sonn- und Fest-tägliche Cantaten: Nebst einigen andern Liedern. Breßlau/Leipzig, 1720 (reprints 1725, 1727 and 1737)
- Siegmund, Bert (2007). "Zu Chronologie und Textgrundlagen der Kantatenjahrgänge von Gottfried Heinrich Stölzel". In Kämper, Dietrich; et al. (eds.). Alte Musik und Auffürungspraxis: Festschrift für Dieter Gutknecht zum 65. Geburtstag (in German). Lit Verlag. pp. 81–92. ISBN 9783825809980.
- Basil Smallman. "Review: Das Kantatenschaffen von Gottfried Heinrich Stölzel by Fritz Hennenberg" pp. 63–66 in Music & Letters Vol. 59, No. 1. Oxford University Press, January 1978.
- (in German) Werner Steger. G.H. Stölzels "Abhandlung vom Recitativ". Heidelberg, 1962 OCLC 494164878
- Wollny, Peter (2008). "Bekennen will ich seinen Namen: Authentizität, Bestimmung und Kontext der Arie BWV 200. Anmerkungen zu Johann Sebastian Bachs Rezeption von Werken Gottfried Heinrich Stölzels" [Bekennen will ich seinen Namen: authenticity, purpose and context of the aria BWV 200. Annotations regarding Johann Sebastian Bach's reception of Gottfried Heinrich Stölzel's works]. Bach-Jahrbuch 2008 [Bach Yearbook 2008]. Bach-Jahrbuch (in German). Vol. 94. Neue Bachgesellschaft. Leipzig: Evangelische Verlagsanstalt. pp. 123–158. doi:10.13141/bjb.v2008. ISBN 978-3-374-02668-5. ISSN 0084-7682.
