= An Wasserflüssen Babylon =

1525 Lutheran hymn by Wolfgang Dachstein

- Lutheran hymn
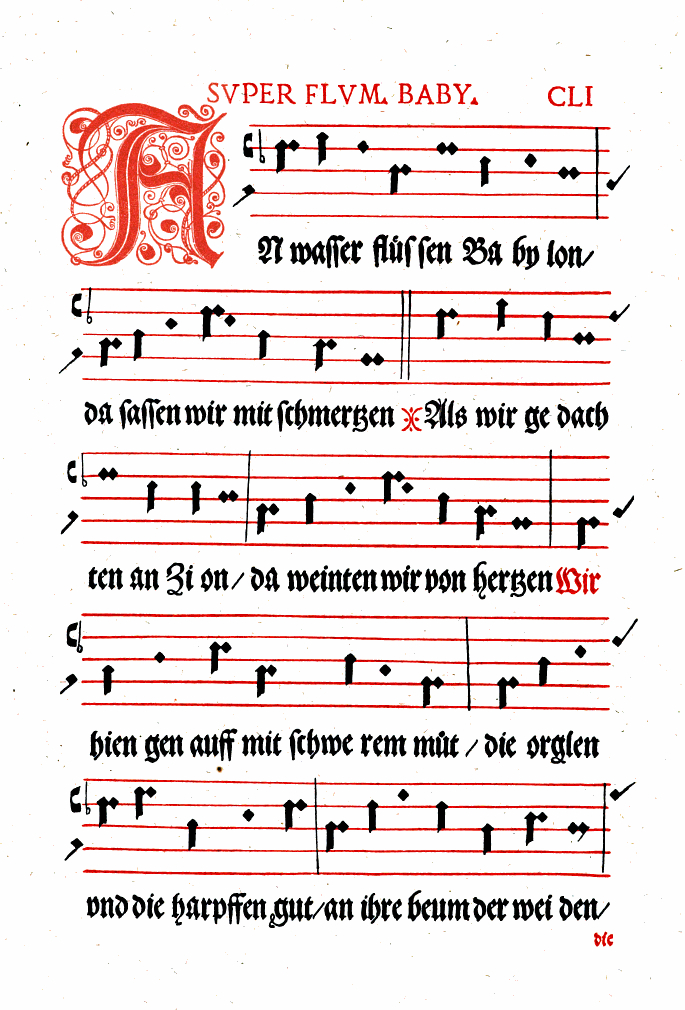
- Super Flumina Babylonis, "An Wasserflüssen Babylon," from the 1541 Straßburger Gesangbuch
- English: By the rivers of Babylon
- Catalogue: Zahn 7663
- Text: Wolfgang Dachstein
- Language: German
- Based on: Psalm 137
- Published: 1525

"An Wasserflüssen Babylon" (By the rivers of Babylon) is a Lutheran hymn by Wolfgang Dachstein, which was first published in Strasbourg in 1525. The text of the hymn is a paraphrase of Psalm 137. Its singing tune, which is the best known part of the hymn and Dachstein's best known melody, was popularised as the chorale tune of Paul Gerhardt's 17th-century Passion hymn "Ein Lämmlein geht und trägt die Schuld". With this hymn text, Dachstein's tune is included in the Protestant hymnal Evangelisches Gesangbuch.

Several vocal and organ settings of the hymn "An Wasserflüssen Babylon" have been composed in the 17th and 18th centuries, including short four-part harmonisations by Johann Hermann Schein, Heinrich Schütz and Johann Sebastian Bach. In the second half of the 17th century, Johann Pachelbel, Johann Adam Reincken and Bach's cousin, Johann Christoph, arranged settings for chorale preludes. Reincken's setting of "An Wasserflüssen Babylon" was elaborate and of great length; with one of Pachelbel's shorter settings as a chorale prelude, it forms the earliest extant transcriptions of Bach, copied on a 1700 organ tablature in Lüneburg when he was still a youth; remarkably, they were only unearthed in Weimar in 2005.

In 1720, at a celebrated organ concert in Hamburg, Bach extemporised a chorale setting of "An Wasserflüssen Babylon" in the presence of Reincken, two years before his death; earlier, during his second period in Weimar, Bach had already composed two organ settings of the chorale prelude. Finally, during his maturity in Leipzig, Bach reworked the chorale prelude as BWV 653, part of his Great Eighteen Chorale Preludes, written in 1739–1742.

== History and context ==
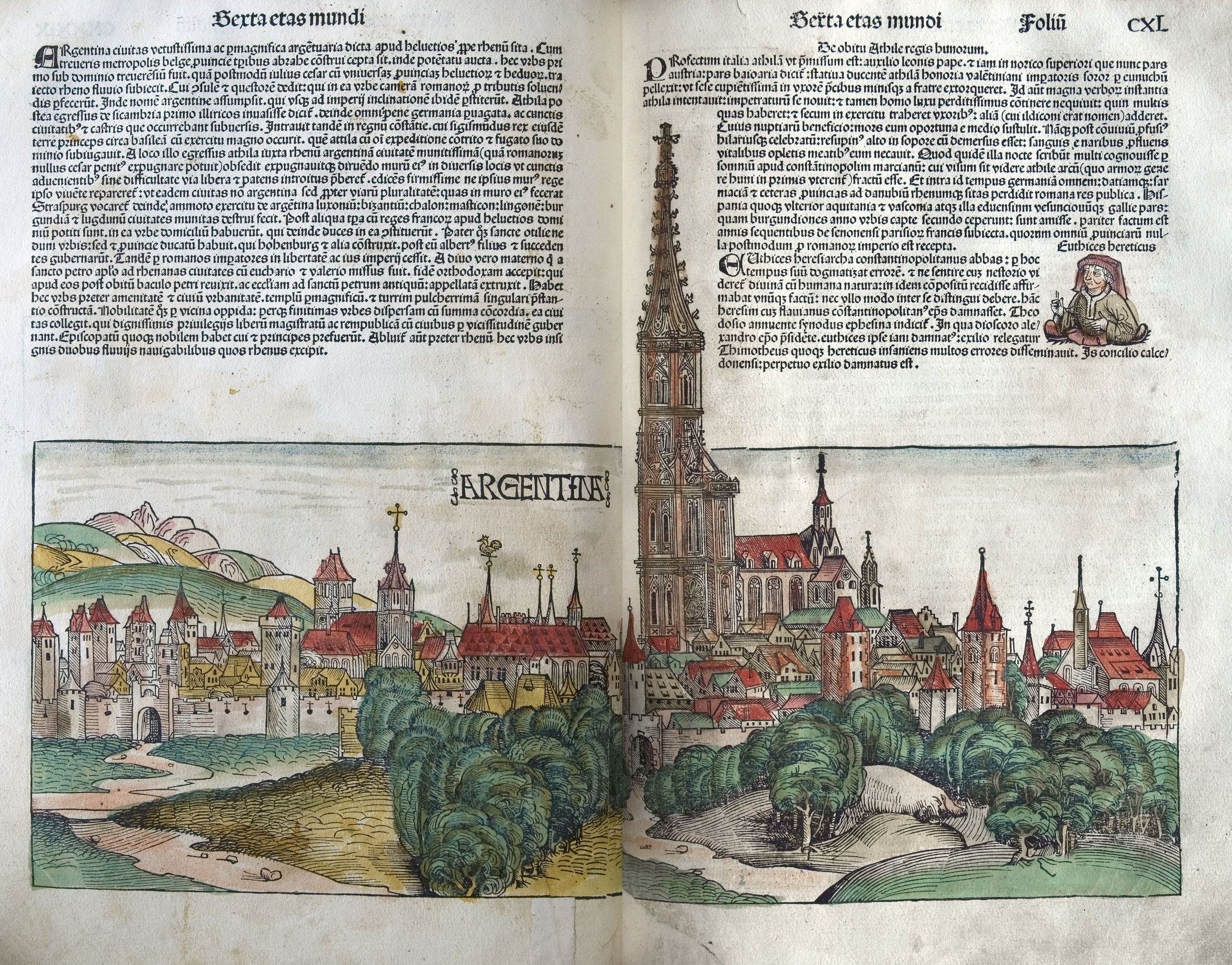
Woodcut of Strasbourg from Nuremberg Chronicle, Hartmann Schedel, 1493: Cathedral (r) and St Thomas (l)

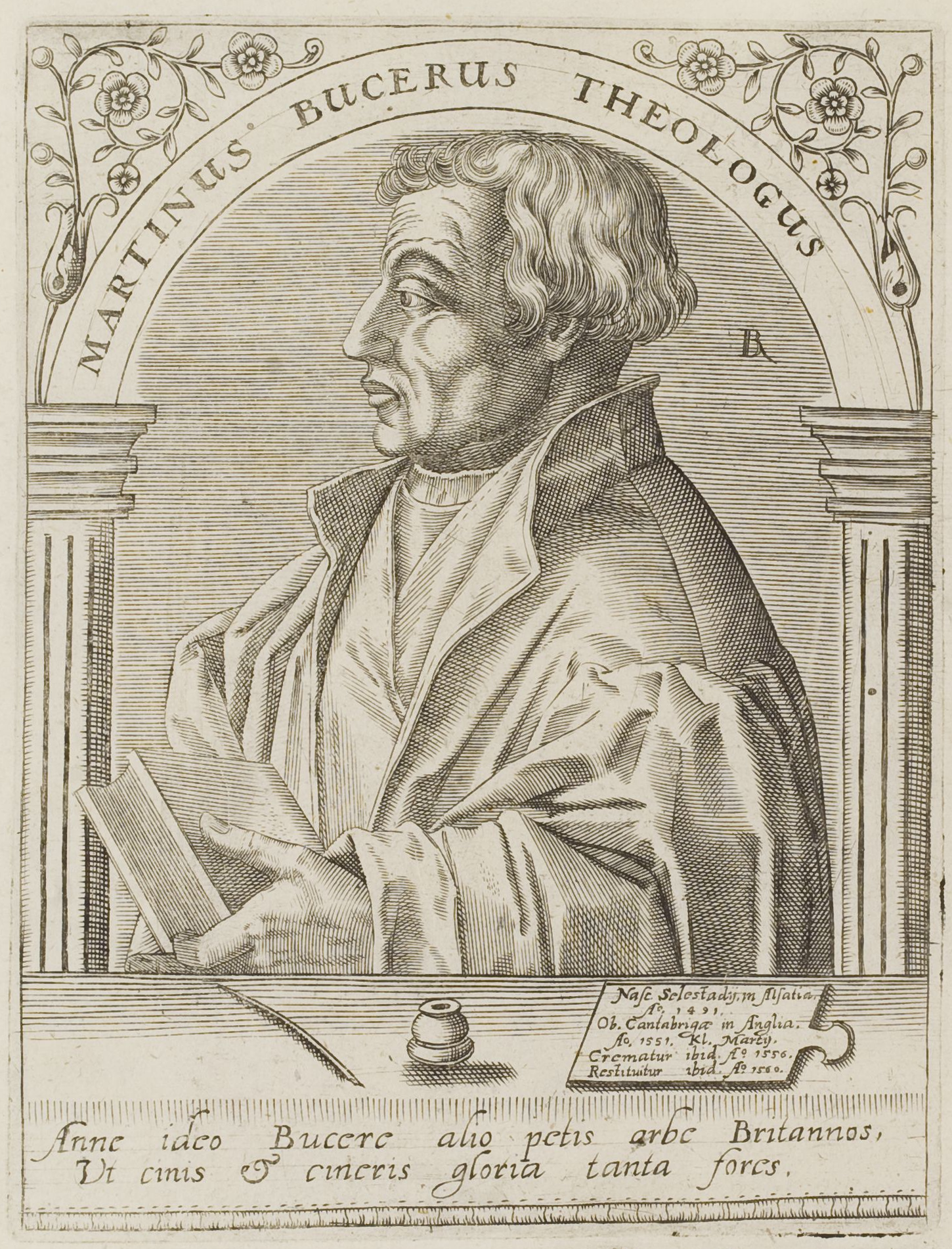
Martin Bucer, "Icones quinquaginta vivorum": engraving by Jean-Jacques Boissard

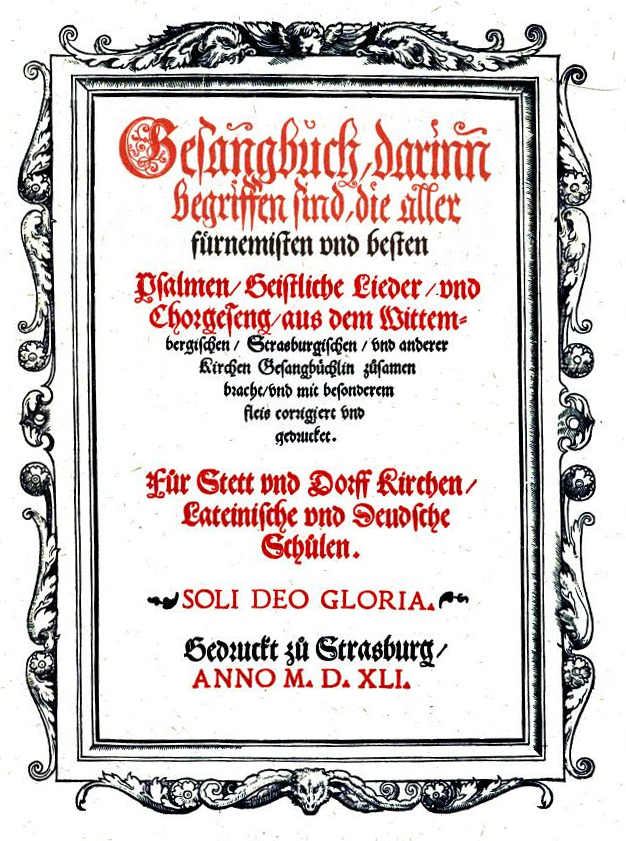
Title page of the 1541 Straßburger Gesangbuch

"An Wasserflüssen Babylon" is a Lutheran hymn written in 1525 and attributed to Wolfgang Dachstein, organist at St Thomas' Church, Strasbourg. The hymn is a closely paraphrased versification of Psalm 137, "By the rivers of Babylon", a lamentation for Jerusalem, exiled in Babylon. Its text and melody, Zahn No. 7663, first appeared in Strasbourg in 1525 in Wolf Köpphel's Das dritt theil Straßburger kirchenampt. This Strasbourg tract, which comprised the third part of the Lutheran service, is now lost. Despite the lost tract from 1525, the Strasbourg hymn appeared in print in 1526 in Psalmen, Gebett und Kirchenordnung wie sie zu Straßburg gehalten werden and later.

Wolfgang Egeloph Dachstein was born in 1487 in Offenburg in the Black Forest. In 1503 he became a fellow student with Martin Luther at the University of Erfurt. He entered the Dominican monastic order in around 1520 in Strasbourg, where he started a collaboration with Matthias Greiter, a friend and contemporary. Greiter was born in 1495 in Aichach, near Augsburg in Bavaria, where he attended a Latin school, before enrolling in theology at the University of Freiburg in 1510 and becoming a monk in Strasbourg in 1520.

During the Reformation, Protestantism was adopted in Strasbourg in 1524. The reforms involved the introduction of the German vernacular, the use of Lutheran liturgy ("Gottesdienstordnung") and congregational singing. Both Greiter and Dachstein renounced their monastic vows and married in Alsace. Their association continued, with Greiter becoming a cantor in the Cathedral and Dachstein an organist at St Thomas. Both played an important role in the musical life of Strasbourg, with many contributions to Lutheran hymns and psalms. Daniel Specklin, a 16th-century architect from Alsace, where the region Dachstein takes its name, described in detail how the pair engaged in "das evangelium" and "vil gute psalmen". A costly edition of the Straßburger Gesangbuch was published by Köpphel in 1541, with a preface by the Lutheran reformer Martin Bucer: the title, text and psalm were printed in characteristic red and black with woodcuts by Hans Baldung. During the Counter-Reformation, however, the Augsburg Interim resulted in Strasbourg reinstating Catholicism in October 1549: both Dachstein and Greiter renounced Protestantism and Bucer was sent into exile in England, where under Edward VI he became Regius Professor of Divinity.

Dachstein's hymn "An Wasserflüssen Babylon" was rapidly distributed—it was printed in Luther's 1545 Babstsches Gesangbuch—and spread to most Lutheran hymnbooks by central Germany. The hymn tune is Dachstein's best known composition. The melody of the hymn became better known than its text, through the association of that melody with Paul Gerhardt's 17th-century Passion hymn "Ein Lämmlein geht und trägt die Schuld". With that hymn text, the hymn tune of "An Wasserflüssen Babylon" was adopted as EG 83 in the Protestant hymnal Evangelisches Gesangbuch. After the Sack of Magdeburg in 1631, during the Thirty Years' War, it was decreed that Dachstein's 137th Psalm would be sung every year as part of the ceremonies to commemorate the destruction of Magdeburg—"O Magdeburg, du schoene Stadt verbrunnen verstoert."; and, amongst Ashkenazi culture, there was also a Hebrew version of Dachstein's composition in the same period.

== Text ==
The Lutheran text of Dachstein first appeared in 1525. Miles Coverdale provided an early English translation in the Tudor Protestant Hymnal "Ghostly Psalms and Spiritual Songs," 1539. These Lutheran versifications were written in continental Europe while Coverdale was in exile from England.

German text

English translation

1. An Wasserflüssen Babylon,
Da saßen wir mit Schmerzen;
Als wir gedachten an Sion,
Da weinten wir von Herzen;
Wir hingen auf mit schwerem Mut
Die Orgeln und die Harfen gut
An ihre Bäum der Weiden,
Die drinnen sind in ihrem Land,
Da mussten wir viel Schmach und Schand
Täglich von ihnen leiden.

At the ryvers of Babilon,
There sat we downe ryght hevely;
Even whan we thought upon Sion,
We wepte together sorofully.
For we were in soch hevynes,
That we forgat al our merynes,
And lefte of all oure sporte and playe:
On the willye trees that were thereby
We hanged up oure harpes truly,
And morned sore both nyght and daye.

2. Die uns gefangen hielten lang
So hart an selben Orten
Begehrten von uns ein Gesang
Mit gar spöttlichen Worten
Und suchten in der Traurigkeit
Ein fröhlichn Gsang in unserm Leid
Ach lieber tut uns singen
Ein Lobgesang, ein Liedlein schon
Von den Gedichten aus Zion,
Das fröhlich tut erklingen.

They that toke us so cruelly,
And led us bounde into pryson,
Requyred of us some melody.
With wordes full of derision.
When we had hanged oure harpes alwaye,
This cruell folke to us coulde saye:
Now let us heare some mery songe,
Synge us a songe of some swete toyne,
As ye were wont to synge at Sion,
Where ye have lerned to synge so longe.

3. Wie sollen wir in solchem Zwang
Und Elend, jetzt vorhanden,
Dem Herren singen ein Gesang
Sogar in fremden Landen?
Jerusalem, vergiss ich dein,
So wolle Gott, der G'rechte, mein
Vergessen in meim Leben,
Wenn ich nicht dein bleib eingedenk
Mein Zunge sich oben ane häng
Und bleib am Rachen kleben.

To whome we answered soberly:
Beholde now are we in youre honde:
How shulde we under captivite
Synge to the Lorde in a straunge londe?
Hierusalem, I say to the,
Yf I remember the not truly,
My honde playe on the harpe no more:
Yf I thynke not on the alwaye,
Let my tonge cleve to my mouth for aye,
And let me loose my speache therfore.

4. Ja, wenn ich nicht mit ganzem Fleiss,
Jerusalem, dich ehre,
Im Anfang meiner Freude Preis
Von jetzt und immermehre,
Gedenk der Kinder Edom sehr,
Am Tag Jerusalem, o Herr,
Die in der Bosheit sprechen:
Reiss ab, reiss ab zu aller Stund,
Vertilg sie gar bis auf den Grund,
Den Boden wolln wir brechen!

Yee, above all myrth and pastaunce,
Hierusalem, I preferre the.
Lorde, call to thy remembraunce
The sonnes of Edom ryght strately,
In the daye of the destruction,
Which at Hierusalem was done;
For they sayd in theyr cruelnes,
Downe with it, downe with it, destroye it all;
Downe with it soone, that it may fall,
Laye it to the grounde all that there is.

5. Die schnöde Tochter Babylon,
Zerbrochen und zerstöret,
Wohl dem, der wird dir gebn den Lohn
Und dir, das wiederkehret,
Dein Übermut und Schalkheit gross,
Und misst dir auch mit solchem Mass,
Wie du uns hast gemessen;
Wohl dem, der deine Kinder klein
Erfasst und schlägt sie an ein Stein,
Damit dein wird vergessen!

O thou cite of Babilon,
Thou thy selfe shalt be destroyed.
Truly blessed shall be that man
Which, even as thou hast deserved,
Shall rewarde the with soch kyndnesse
As thou hast shewed to us gyltlesse,
Which never had offended the.
Blessed shall he be that for the nones
Shall throwe thy chyldren agaynst the stones,
To brynge the out of memorie.

== Hymn tune ==
Below is the 1525 hymn tune by Wolfgang Dachstein.

== Musical settings ==
=== 16th century ===
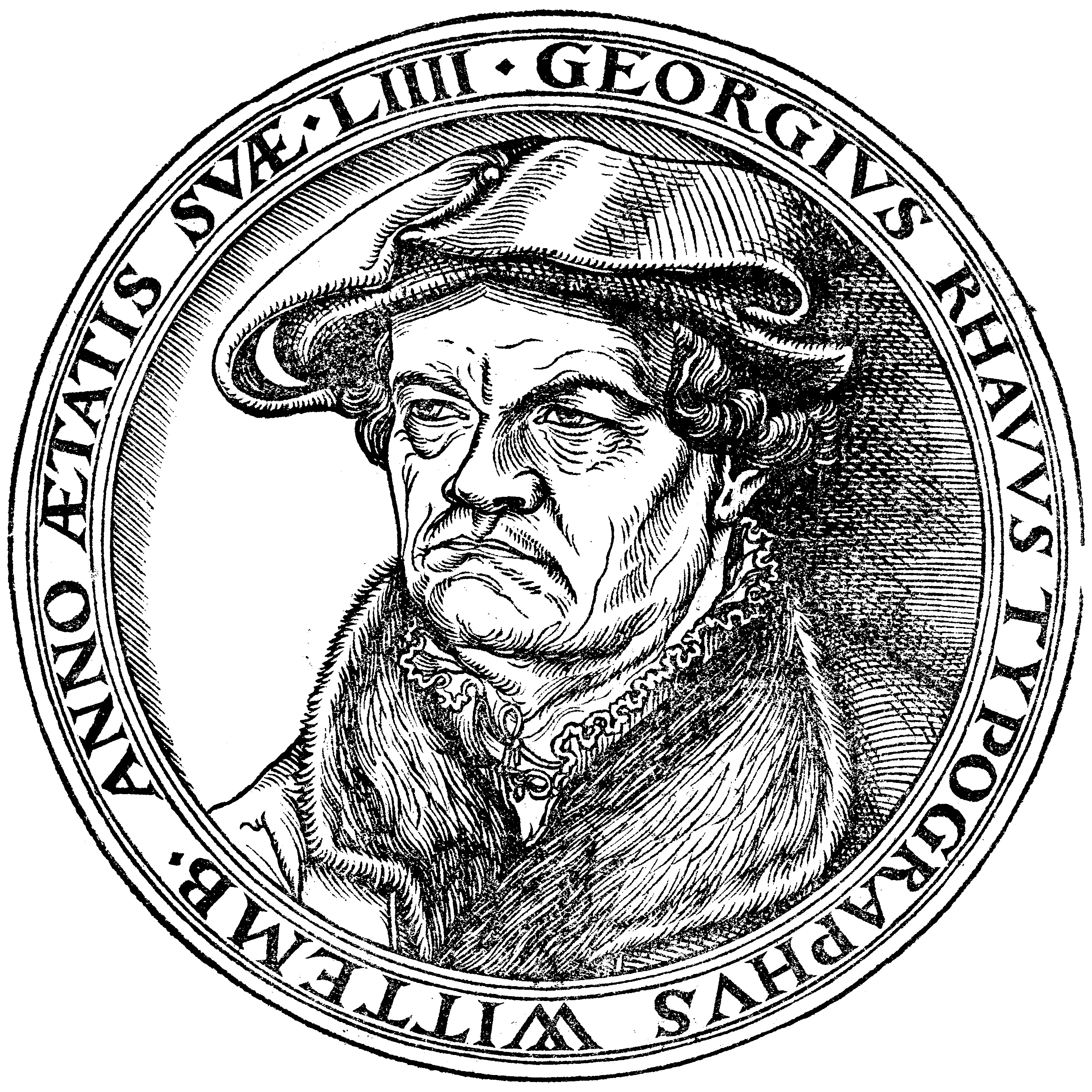
Georg Rhau, the Thomaskantor: woodcut by Lucas Cranach the Elder c. 1542

Lupus Hellinck's four-part setting of "An Wasserflüssen Babylon" was published in 1544. The treatment is motet-like: the first part of the hymn tune is presented by the soprano voice, however adorned with inserted supplemental melodies, after which the tenor voice presents the rest of the hymn tune, with similar embellishments. Another four-part setting of the hymn, likewise first published in Georg Rhau's Newe Deudsche Geistliche Gesenge, is by Benedictus Ducis. A three-part setting by this composer had already been published in 1541. The 115 Guter newer Liedlein collection, published in 1544, contains an extended choral setting by Johannes Wannenmacher: in this version, each stanza of the hymn is set for a different group of singers, from three to six voices. Wannenmacher's two-part setting (bicinium) of the hymn was published in 1553.

Sigmund Hemmel used the text in the 1550s in his four-part setting, with the cantus firmus in the tenor: Der gantz Psalter Davids, wie derselbig in teutsche Gesang verfasse was printed in 1569.

=== 17th century ===
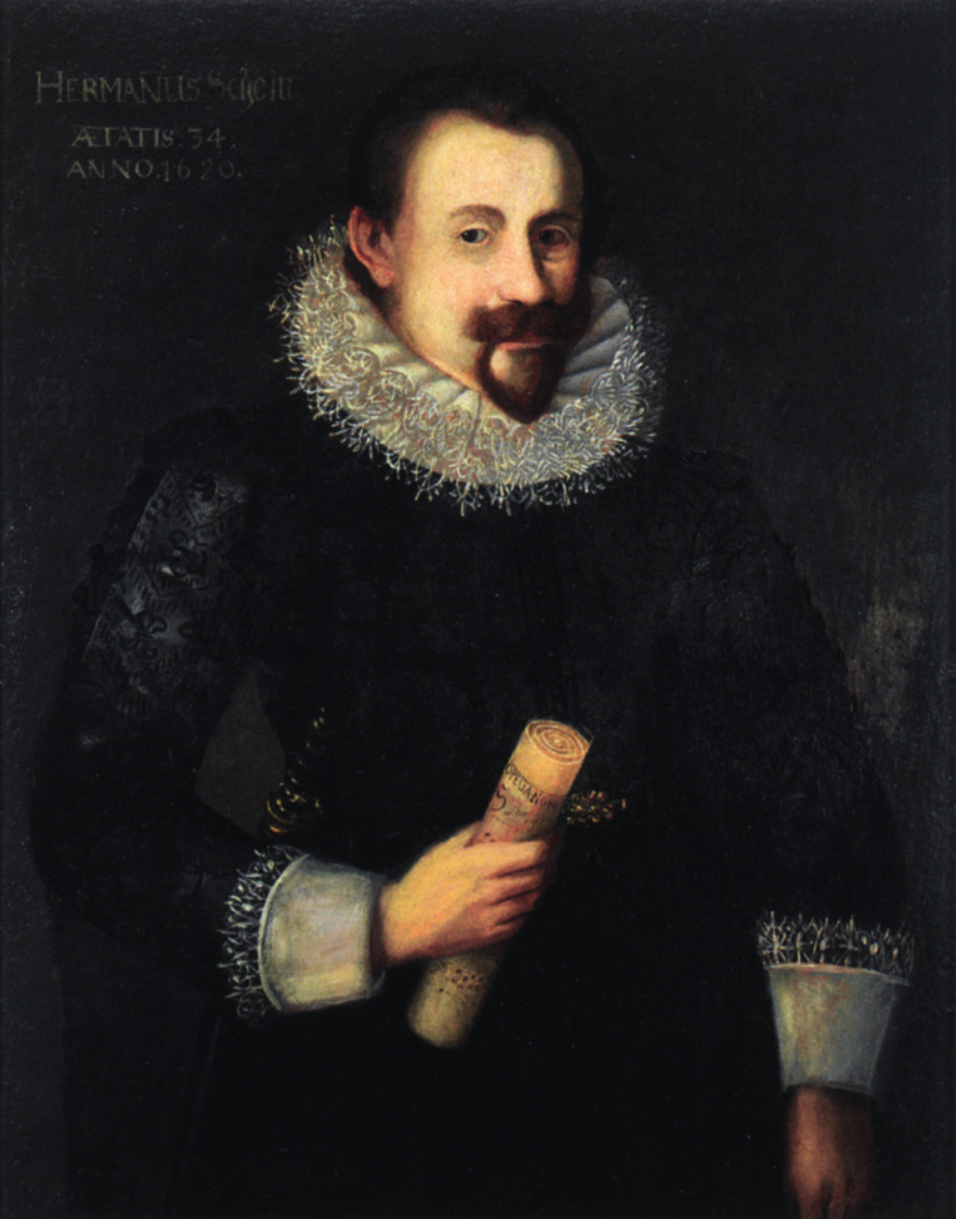
Johann Hermann Schein, 1620, Leipzig

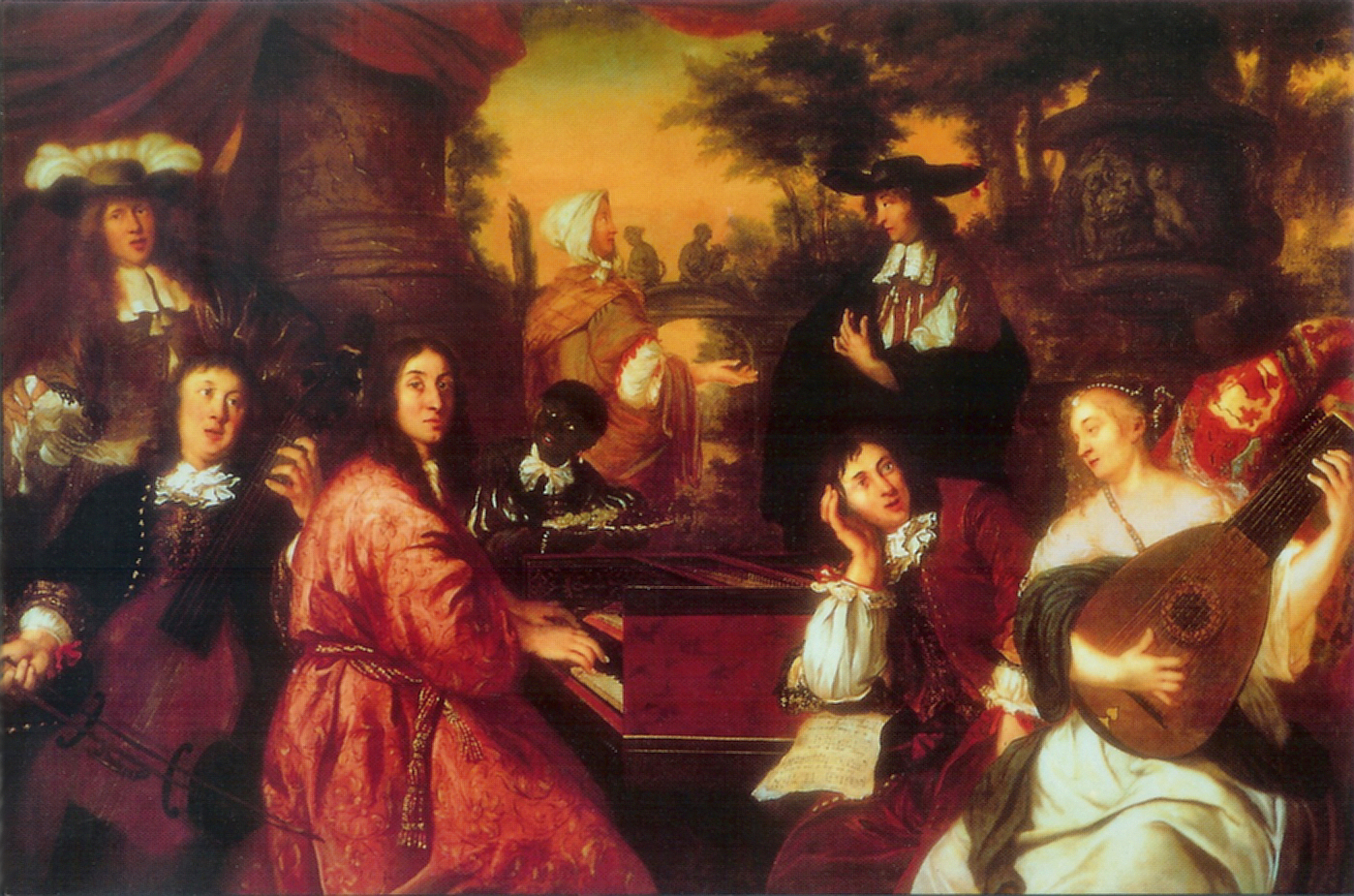
Musical Company, Johannes Voorhout, 1674: Reincken at the harpsichord with Buxtehude at the viol

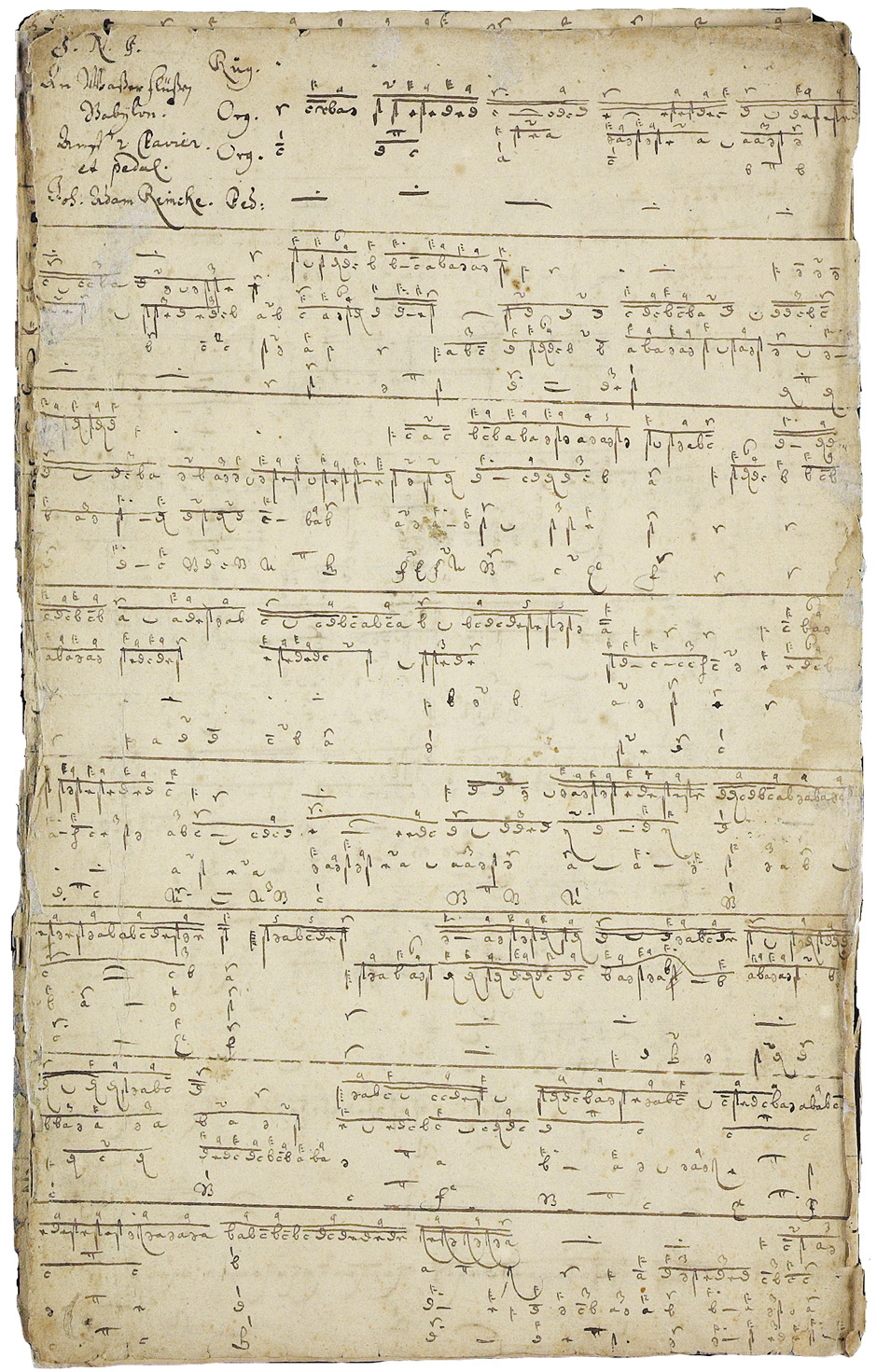
Reincken's organ chorale "An Wasserflüssen Babylon" in a tablature copy once owned by Bach

A native of Nuremberg, Hans Leo Hassler was taught by Andrea Gabrieli in Venice, where he excelled as a keyboard player and consorted with his younger uncle, Giovanni Gabrieli. Hassler's 4-part setting of "An Wasserflüssen Babylon" was composed in 1608.

Johann Hermann Schein composed a setting of "An Wasserflüssen Babylon" for two sopranos and instrumental accompaniment, which he published in 1617. His 1627 Cantional contained a four-part setting of the hymn, a setting which was republished by Vopelius's Neu Leipziger Gesangbuch (1682). In 1628 Heinrich Schütz published a four-part harmonisation of "An Wasserflüssen Babylon", SWV 242, in the Psalmen Davids, hiebevorn in teutzsche Reimen gebracht, durch D. Cornelium Beckern, und an jetzo mit ein hundert und drey eigenen Melodeyen ... gestellet, the Becker Psalter, Op. 5. Samuel Scheidt, composed two settings of the hymn, SSWV 505 and 570, for soprano and organ in the Tabulatur-Buch hundert geistlicher Lieder und Psalmen of 1650.

Franz Tunder composed a setting of the hymn for soprano, strings and continuo. Organist at the Marienkirche, Lübeck from 1646 to 1668, Tunder initiated his Abendmusik there. Buxtehude later married Tunder's daughter and succeeded him as organist at Lübeck.

The hymn also inspired organ compositions in Northern Germany. Organ chorale preludes and free works by Johann Christoph Bach (Johann Sebastian's first cousin once removed), Johann Adam Reincken, Johann Pachelbel and Johann Sebastian Bach have been based on "An Wasserflüssen Babylon".

The 17th-century musical style of the stylus phantasticus covers the freely composed organ and harpsichord/clavichord works, including dance suites. They lie within two traditions: those from northern Germany, primarily for organ using the whole range of manual and pedal techniques, with passages of virtuoso exuberance; and those from central Germany, primarily for string keyboards, which have a more subdued style. Buxtehude and Reincken are important exponents of the northern school and Pachelbel those from the centre.

Johann Christoph Bach was born in Arnstadt in 1642 and was appointed organist at St George's, the principal church of Eisenach, from 1665. The 4-part chorale prelude "An Wasserflüssen Babylon" has the same kind of expressive dissonances, with suspensions, as his Lamento "Ach, daß ich Wassers gnug hätte" for voice and strings.

Born probably in 1643, Reincken was the natural successor to Scheidemann as organist at the St. Catherine's Church, Hamburg, with his musical interests extending beyond the church to the Hamburg Opera and the collegium musicum: as remarked by the 18th-century musician Johann Gottfried Walther, his famous, dazzling and audacious chorale fantasia "An Wasserflüssen Babylon" probably marked that succession; its vast dimension of 327 bars and 10 chorale lines, some broken into two, encompass a wide range of techniques, such as its "motet-like development, figuration of the chorale in the soprano, fore-imitation in diminished note values, introduction of counter-motifs, virtuoso passage work, double pedals, fragmentation, and echo effects." A detailed account of the history and musical structure of the chorale fantasia has been given in Rodgers (2013).

The composer and organist Johann Pachelbel (1653–1707), born in Nuremberg in Bavaria, was most active in central Germany, particularly Thuringia. His vocal and instrumental music reflected the musical traditions across Germany. Having spent some of his early years as a musician in Vienna, he was appointed to the Predigerkirche, Erfurt in 1679–1690 As part of his duties as official organist at the Predigerkirche in Erfurt, 1678–1690, Pachelbel was required to give a concert each year to show his musical skills; the same contract also prescribed preludes for chorales. As outlined in Butt & Nolte (2001), Pachelbel's repertoire contained eight different types of chorale preludes, the last of which formed a "hybrid combination-form", one which he particularly favoured. The chorales on "An Wasserflüssen Babylon" were all of that type: a concise four-part fugue followed by a 3-part setting accompanying a slow cantus firmus in the soprano or bass; or a 4-part setting with the soprano in the cantus firmus. The 2004 catalogue of Pachelbel's works, compiled posthumously by Jean M. Perreault, lists four chorale preludes based on the "An Wasserflüssen Babylon." Another organ work by Pachelbel based on the hymn was discovered in 2006 in the same manuscript as Reincken's chorale fantasia. Its first recording, a performance by Jean-Claude Zehnder, was issued in 2007.

=== 18th century ===
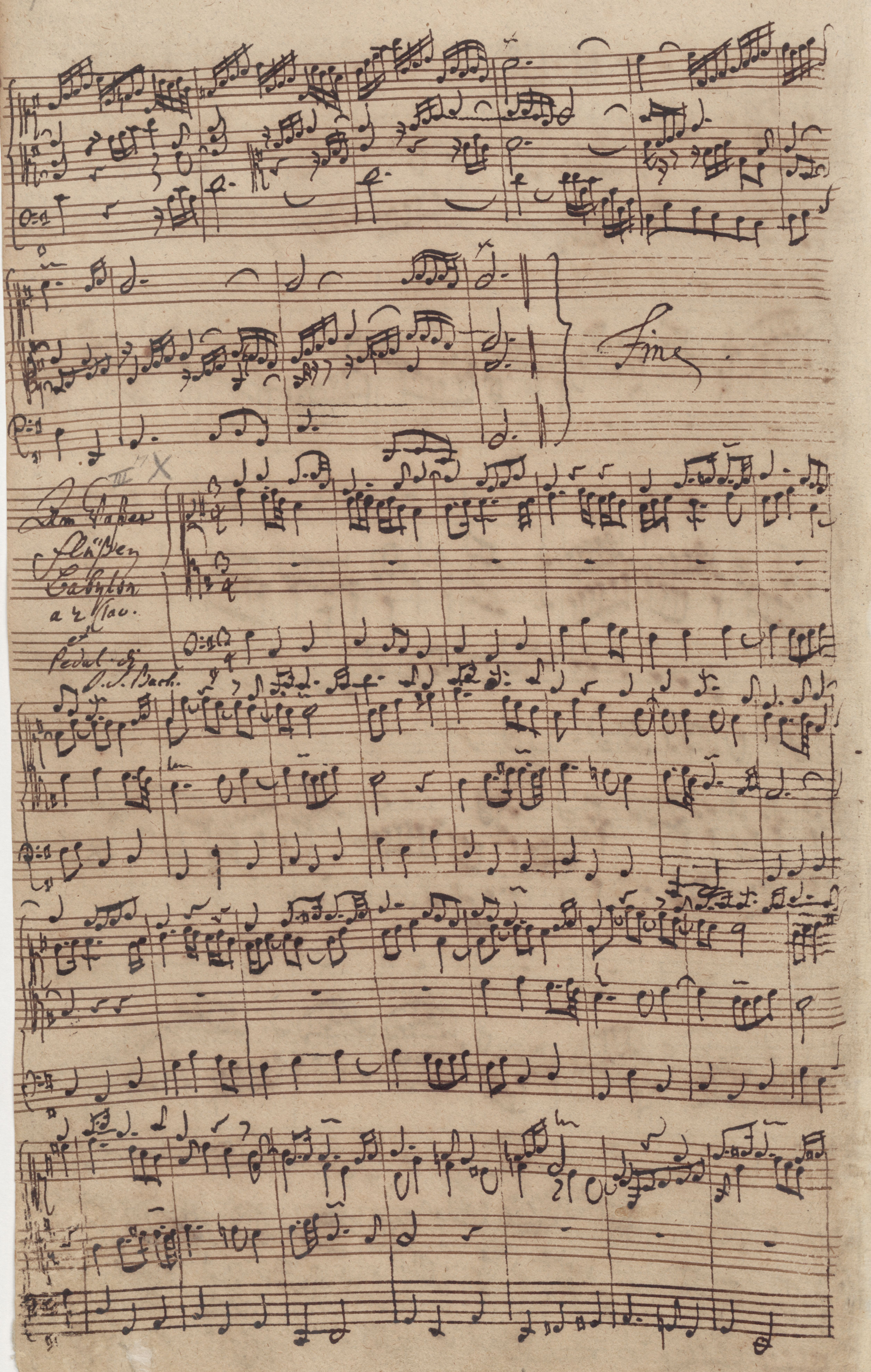
Autograph manuscript of Bach's BWV 653

The young Johann Sebastian Bach was aware of Reincken's reputation and owned a copy of the chorale fantasia when he studied with Georg Böhm in 1700. Bach's copy, in organ tablature, was rediscovered in 2005 at the Herzogin Anna Amalia Bibliothek in Weimar by Michael Maul and Peter Wollny, and as such is believed to be one of Bach's oldest extant manuscripts. In a posthumous article, Beißwenger (2017) wrote that, "Whether, however, Bach is the copyist of the source is not determined with certainty from the research conducted to date."

Reincken, whose celebrated chorale fantasia had already acquired a reputation, repaid the debt to Bach. In Stinson (2001) there is a description of a concert in 1720, when Bach extemporised for "almost half an hour" on An Wasserflüssen Babylon at the organ loft of St. Catherine's Church, Hamburg. As recorded in his obituary, Bach "travelled to Hamburg, and allowed himself, in front of the Magistrat and many sophisticated people of the City, to be listened to for more than two hours on the beautiful organ at the Catherinenkirche with general amazement. The old organist at this church, Johann Adam Reincken, who then was almost a hundred years old, listened to him with special pleasure and particularly complimented him on the chorale "An Wasserflüssen Babylon" which our Bach treated and improvised for almost half an hour in a different way, very spaciously, as the brave ones among the Hamburg organists formerly used to play during the Saturday vespers. Reincken complimented him as follows: "I thought this kind of art had died out but I see that it is still alive in you"."

Bach composed his chorale prelude "An Wasserflüssen Babylon," BWV 653, as the third chorale of the Great Eighteen Chorale Preludes It was written in Leipzig, around 1739–1742, in his full maturity. There were also two earlier settings composed in Bach's second period at Weimar in the 1710s, one in five parts with a double-pedal. During his second period in Weimar, Bach had also envisaged expanding his collection of 46 chorale preludes in the miniaturist Orgelbüchlein. Empty manuscript pages were allocated for the projected 164 chorale preludes; as with "An Wasserflüssen Babylon," only the title appears.

In BWV 653 the same melancholic sarabande-like music of the chorale prelude can be heard in Bach's closing movements of the monumental Passions: the increasing chromaticism and passing dissonances create a mood of pathos. The mournful cantus firmus of BWV 653 is heard in the tenor voice en taille, accompanied by the two higher voices of the imitative ritornello with its steady crotchets and quavers in the pedals. The coda of BWV 653 shares some compositional features of Reincken's chorale prelude: the ornamental descending flourish at the end of Reincken's coda

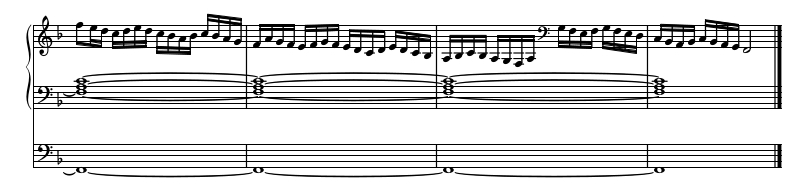

can be compared with Bach's closing coda of BWV 653 with scales in contrary motion in the lower manual and pedal.

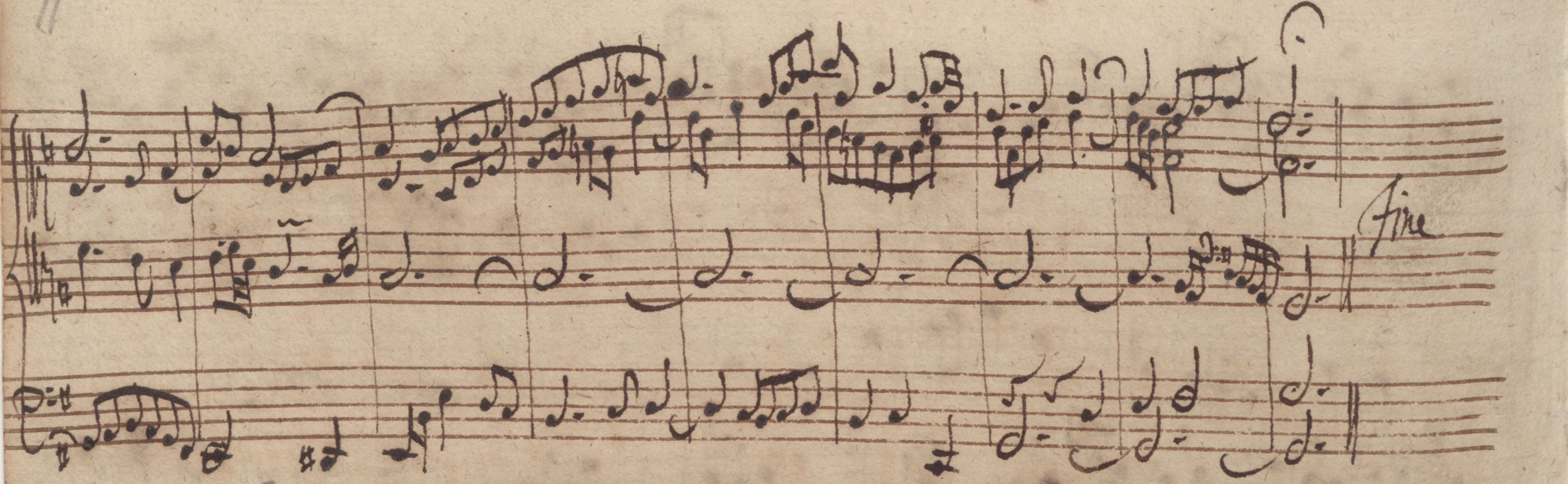

As Stinson writes, "It is hard not to believe that this correspondence represents an act of homage." Despite being composed in Leipzig within the traditions of Thuringia, however, Bach's contemplative "mesmerising" mood is far removed from his earlier improvisatory compositions in Hamburg and Reincken's chorale fantasia: the later chorale prelude is understated, with its cantus firmus subtly embellished.

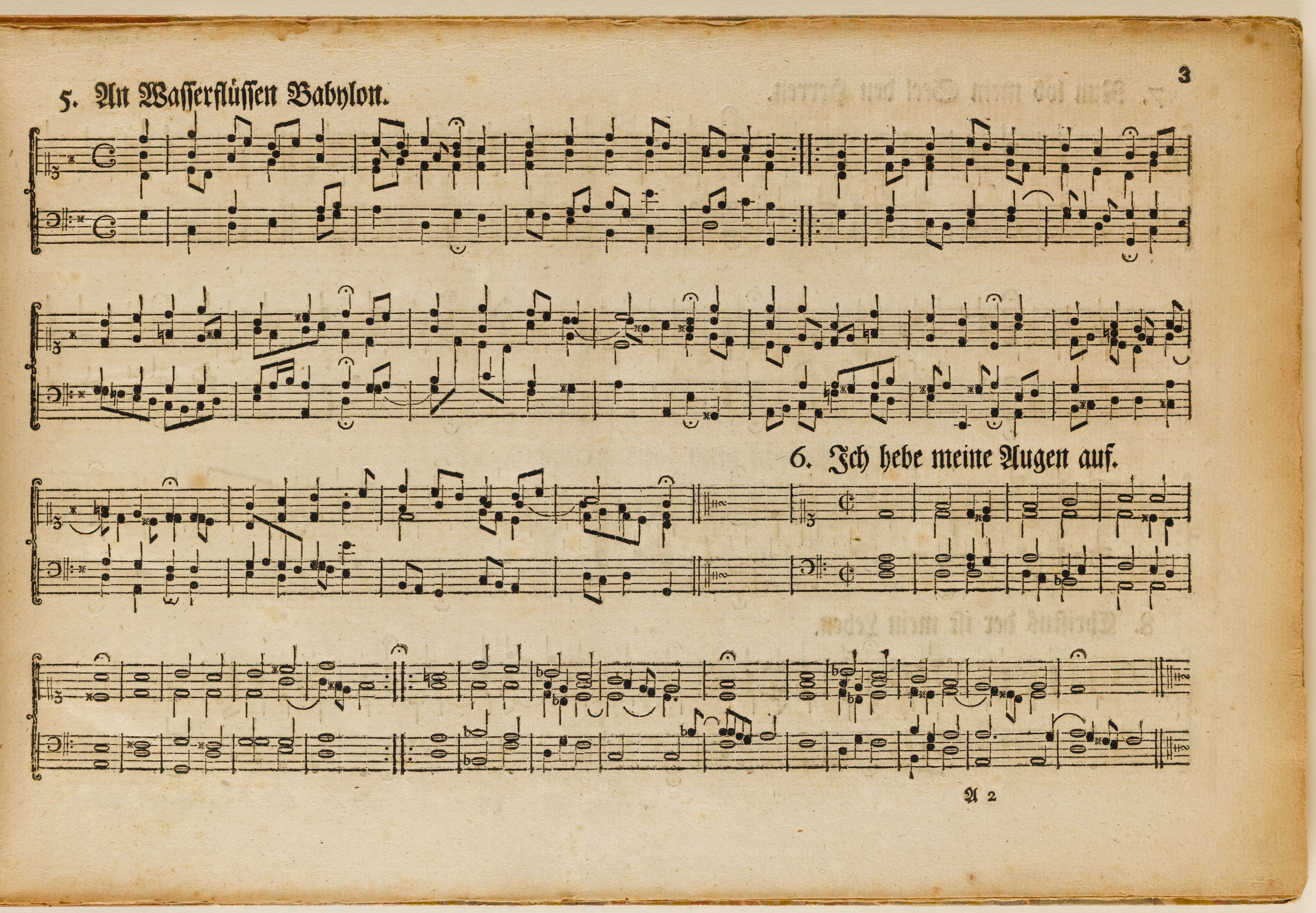
4-part chorale of "An Wasserflüssen Babylon" by J.S. Bach, edition of C.P.E. Bach & F.W. Birnstiel, 1765

There was also a four-part harmonisation of the chorale, BWV 267, published after Bach's death. It was part of a collection of 149 four-part chorales, made by the Thomasschule copyist Johann Ludwig Dietel in 1735 and unearthed only in 1981. Schulze (1983) has given a detailed historical account of how the chorales were discovered, including background on the three Berlin musicians who first set about publishing them in the second half of the eighteenth century–Friedrich Wilhelm Marpurg, C. P. E. Bach and Johann Kirnberger. During that period, copies of the harmonisation have been found in G major and in A♭ major, both as "An Wasserflüssen Babylon" and as "Ein Lämmlein geht und trägt die Schuld": in the Breitkopf edition of the 1780s it appears as No. 5 in G major under the former title and as No. 309 in A♭ major under the latter title. In Schemelli's 1736 hymnal, to which Bach collaborated, the key of the "An Wasserflüssen Babylon" hymn, No. 587, is given as "D", and that of seven other hymns sung to the same melody, including "Ein Lämmlein geht und trägt die Schuld", No. 259, as "G".

=== 19th century ===
The German composer of opera— Die lustigen Weiber von Windsor—and lieder, Otto Nicolai composed a 4-part setting of "An Wasserflüssen Babylon" in around 1832 as one of four songs in his op.17.

== Notes ==
=== References ===
- Adler, Margit (31 August 2006). "Earliest Music Manuscripts by Johann Sebastian Bach Discovered". www.klassik-stiftung.de. Klassik Stiftung Weimar.
- Apel, Willi (1972). The History of Keyboard Music to 1700. Translated by Hans Tischler. Indiana University Press. ISBN 0253211417.
- Axmacher, Elke; Fischer, Michael (2002). "83 – Ein Lämmlein geht und trägt die Schuld". In Hahn, Gerhard; Henkys, Jürgen (eds.). Liederkunde zum Evangelischen Gesangbuch (in German). Vol. 5. Göttingen: Vandenhoeck & Ruprecht. pp. 60–70. ISBN 978-3-52-550326-3.
- Bach, J.S. (1998). David, Hans T.; Mendel, Arthur; Wolff, Christoph (eds.). The New Bach Reader: A Life of Johann Sebastian Bach in Letters and Documents. W.W. Norton. ISBN 0393319563.
- Beißwenger, Kirsten (2017). "Other Composers". In Leaver, Robin A. (ed.). The Routledge Research Companion to Johann Sebastian Bach. Translated by Emerson Morgan. Taylor & Francis. pp. 237–264. ISBN 9781409417903.
- Brusniak, Friedhelm (2001). "Matthias Greiter". In Herbst, Wolfgang (ed.). Wer ist wer im Gesangbuch?. Handbuch Zum Evangelischen Gesangbuch (in German). Vol. 2. Vandenhoeck & Ruprecht. pp. 121–122. ISBN 3525503237.
- Butt, John (2004). "Germany and the Netherlands". In Silbiger, Alexander (ed.). Keyboard Music Before 1700 (2nd ed.). Routledge. pp. 140–221. ISBN 0415968917.
- Butt, John; Nolte, Ewald V. (2001). Butt, John (ed.). "Johann Pachelbel". Grove Music Online. Oxford University Press. doi:10.1093/gmo/9781561592630.article.6002278237.
- Collins, Paul (2005). The Stylus Phantasticus and Free Keyboard Music of the North German Baroque. Ashgate Publishing. ISBN 9780754634164.
- Coverdale, Miles (1846). "Ghostly Psalms and Spiritual Songs". In Pearson, George (ed.). Remains of Myles Coverdale. Parker Society. Vol. 14. Cambridge University Press. pp. 571–572.
- Fornaçon, Siegfried (1957). "Dachstein, Wolfgang". Neue Deutsche Biographie (in German). Vol. 3. Berlin: Duncker & Humblot. pp. 465–466. (full text online).
- Geck, Martin (2006). Johann Sebastian Bach: Life and Work. Translated by John Hargraves. Houghton Mifflin Harcourt. ISBN 0151006482.
- Hopf, Constantin (1946). Martin Bucer and the English Reformation. Blackwells.
- Julian, John (1907). A Dictionary of Hymnology. Dover Publications. pp. 277–278.
- Krummacher, Friedhelm (1986). "Bach's Free Organ Works and the Stylus Phantasticus". In George Stauffer; Ernest May (eds.). J.S. Bach as Organist. Indiana University Press. pp. 157–171. ISBN 0713452625.
- Krummacher, Christoph (2001). "Leipziger Gesangbuch 1545". In Herbst, Wolfgang (ed.). Wer ist wer im Gesangbuch?. Handbuch Zum Evangelischen Gesangbuch (in German). Vol. 2. Vandenhoeck & Ruprecht. pp. 194–195. ISBN 3525503237.
- Küster, Konrad (1996). "Musik an der Schwelle des Dreißigjährigen Krieges: Perspektiven der Psalmen Davids von Heinrich Schütz". Schütz-Jb. 18: 39–51. doi:10.13141/sjb.v1996830.
- Leahy, Anne (2011). "An Wasserflüssen Babylon". J. S. Bach's "Leipzig" Chorale Preludes: Music, Text, Theology. Contextual Bach Studies. Vol. 3. Scarecrow Press. pp. 37–58. ISBN 978-0810881815.
- Leaver, Robin A. (2014). "Letter Codes Relating to Pitch and Key for Chorale Melodies and Bach's Contributions to the Schemelli "Gesangbuch"". Bach. 45 (1): 15–33. doi:10.1353/bach.2014.a808494. JSTOR 43489888.
- Leaver, Robin A. (2017). "Chorales". In Leaver, Robin A. (ed.). The Routledge Research Companion to Johann Sebastian Bach. Taylor & Francis. pp. 358–376. ISBN 9781409417903.
- Matut, Diana (2011). Dichtung und Musik im frühneuzeitlichen Aschkenas: Ms. opp. add. 4° 136 der Bodleian Library, Oxford (das so genannte Wallich-Manuskript) und Ms. hebr. oct. 219 der Stadt- und Universitätsbibliothek, Frankfurt a. M. [Poetry and Music in Ashkenazi culture of the early modern period: Ms. opp. add. 4° 136 of the Bodleian Library, Oxford (the so-called Wallich Manuscript) and Ms. hebr. oct. 219 of the Frankfurt City and University Library]. Studies in Jewish History and Culture (in German). Vol. 29. Brill. ISBN 9789004181946.
- Maul, Michael; Wollny, Peter, eds. (2007). Weimarer Orgeltabulatur: Die frühesten Notenhandschriften Johann Sebastian Bachs sowie Abschriften seines Schülers Johann Martin Schubart – Mit Werken von Dietrich Buxtehude, Johann Adam Reinken und Johann Pachelbel [Organ tablature from Weimar: Johann Sebastian Bach's earliest music manuscripts, and copies by his pupil Johann Martin Schubart – With works by Dietrich Buxtehude, Johann Adam Reinken and Johann Pachelbel] (Facsimile). Documenta musicologica (in German). Vol. II/39 (1st ed.). Bärenreiter. ISBN 9783761819579. BVK 1957.
- Maul, Michael; Wollny, Peter, eds. (2008). Weimarer Orgeltabulatur: Die frühesten Notenhandschriften Johann Sebastian Bachs sowie Abschriften seines Schülers Johann Martin Schubart – Mit Werken von Dietrich Buxtehude, Johann Adam Reinken und Johann Pachelbel [Organ tablature from Weimar: Johann Sebastian Bach's earliest music manuscripts, and copies by his pupil Johann Martin Schubart – With works by Dietrich Buxtehude, Johann Adam Reinken and Johann Pachelbel] (Performance score) (in German and English). Translated by Robinson, J. Bradford (1st ed.). Bärenreiter. ISMN 9790006534685. BA 5248.
- Melamed, Daniel R.; Marissen, Michael (2006). "Four-part chorales". An Introduction to Bach Studies. Oxford University Press. pp. 124–126. doi:10.1093/acprof:oso/9780195304923.001.0001. ISBN 9780195304923.
- Müller, Hans-Christian (1966). "Greiter, Matthäus". Neue Deutsche Biographie (in German). Vol. 7. Berlin: Duncker & Humblot. pp. 41–42. (full text online).
- Paisey, David; Bartrum, Giulia (2009). "Hans Holbein and Miles Coverdale: A New Woodcut". Print Quarterly. 26 (3): 227–253. JSTOR 43826083.
- Perreault, Jean M. (2004). Fitch, Donna K. (ed.). The Thematic Catalogue of the Musical Works of Johann Pachelbel. Wolff, Christoph (Foreword). Scarecrow Press. ISBN 0810849704.
- Reincken, J.A. (2005). "Preface". In Dirksen, Pieter (ed.). Complete Organ Works. Breitkopf & Härtel. pp. 7–10, 83. ISBN 978-3795797737. Vorwort (in German), Excerpt.
- Reincken, J.A. (2008). "Introduction". In Beckmann, Klaus (ed.). Complete Organ Works (2nd ed.). Schott Music. ISMN 9790001137416.
- Rodgers, Lindsey Henriksen (2013). "V. Johann Adam Reincken" (PDF). The North German Chorale Fantasia: A Sermon Without Words (Thesis). University of Oregon: Cambridge University Press. pp. 154–190.
- Rose, Steven (2017). "The Alt-Bachisches Archiv". In Leaver, Robin A. (ed.). The Routledge Research Companion to Johann Sebastian Bach. Taylor & Francis. pp. 213–236. ISBN 9781409417903.
- Schemelli, Georg Christian (1736). Musicalisches Gesang-Buch, Darinnen 954 geistreiche, sowohl alte als neue Lieder und Arien, mit wohlgesetzten Melodien, in Discant und Baß, befindlich sind: Vornehmlich denen Evangelischen Gemeinen im Stifte Naumburg-Zeitz gewidmet (in German). Leipzig: Bernhard Christoph Breitkopf. RISM 990003407. Facsimiles: szMJMq_zmygC at Google Books; 1077430 Liturg. 1372 o at Bavarian State Library; Musicalisches Gesang-Buch (Schemelli, Georg Christian) at IMSLP website.
- Schering, Arnold (1918). "Johann Philipp Kirnberger als Herausgeber Bachscher Choräle". Bach-Jahrbuch. 15: 141–149. doi:10.13141/bjb.v19181351.
- Schulenberg, David (2003). "Stylus Phantasticus". In Malcolm Boyd; John Butt (eds.). J.S. Bach. Oxford composer companions (2nd ed.). Oxford University Press. p. 471. ISBN 0198606206.
- Schulenberg, David (2006). The keyboard music of J.S. Bach (2nd ed.). Routledge. ISBN 0415974003.
- Schulze, Hans-Joachim (1983). "150 Stück von den Bachischen Erben". Bach-Jahrbuch (in German). 69: 81–100. doi:10.13141/bjb.v19832435.
- Schulze, Hans-Joachim (1996). "J.S. Bach's Vocal Works in the Breitkopf Nonthematic Catalogs of 1761 to 1836". In George B. Stauffer (ed.). J.S. Bach, the Breitkopfs, and Eighteenth-century Music Trade. Bach Perspectives. Vol. 2. University of Nebraska Press. pp. 35–52. ISBN 0803210442.
- Schütz, Heinrich (1628). "Der CXXXVII. Psalm". Psalmen Davids: Hiebevorn in Teutzsche Reimen gebracht durch D. Cornelium Beckern (in German). Freiberg: Georg Hoffman. pp. 560–564. RISM 990058712.
- Schütz, Heinrich (2013). A Heinrich Schütz Reader: Letters and Documents in Translation. Translated by Johnston, Gregory S. United States: Oxford University Press. p. 62. ISBN 978-0199812202.
- Shannon, John R. (2012). The Evolution of Organ Music in the 17th Century: A Study of European Styles. McFarland. ISBN 9780786488667.
- Spagnoli, Gina (1993). "Dresden at the Time of Heinrich Schütz". In Price, Curtis (ed.). The Early Baroque Era: From the late 16th century to the 1660s. Macmillan. pp. 164–184.
- Stinson, Russell (1999). Bach: The Orgelbüchlein. Oxford University Press. pp. 2–9. doi:10.1093/acprof:oso/9780193862142.001.0001. ISBN 9780193862142.
- Stinson, Russell (2001). J.S. Bach's Great Eighteen Organ Chorales. Oxford University Press. pp. 78–80. doi:10.1093/acprof:oso/9780195116663.001.0001. ISBN 0-19-516556-X.
- Stinson, Russel (2012). J. S. Bach at His Royal Instrument: Essays on His Organ Works. Oxford University Press. p. 16. ISBN 978-0199917235.
- Terry, Charles Sanford (1921). "An Wasserflüssen Babylon". The Hymns and Hymn Melodies of the Organ Works. Bach's Chorals. Vol. III. Cambridge University Press. pp. 101–105.
- Tomita, Yo (2017). "Manuscripts". In Leaver, Robin A. (ed.). The Routledge Research Companion to Johann Sebastian Bach. Taylor & Francis. pp. 47–88. ISBN 9781409417903.
- Trocmé-Latter, Daniel (2015). The Singing of the Strasbourg Protestants, 1523-1541. St Andrews Studies in Reformation History. Ashgate. ISBN 9781472432063.
- Varwig, Bettina (2011). Histories of Heinrich Schütz. Cambridge University Press. ISBN 978-1139502016.
- Wachowski, Gerd [in German] (1983). "Die vierstimmigen Choräle Johann Sebastian Bachs: Untersuchungen zu den Druckausgaben von 1765 bis 1932 und zur Frage der Authentizität" [The four-part chorales of Johann Sebastian Bach: research into the printed editions from 1765 to 1732 and regarding the question of authenticity]. In Schulze, Hans-Joachim; Wolff, Christoph (eds.). Bach-Jahrbuch 1983 [Bach Yearbook 1983]. Bach-Jahrbuch (in German). Vol. 69. Neue Bachgesellschaft. Berlin: Evangelische Verlagsanstalt. pp. 51–79. doi:10.13141/bjb.v1983. ISSN 0084-7682.
- Weber, Édith (2001). "Wolfgang Dachstein". In Herbst, Wolfgang (ed.). Wer ist wer im Gesangbuch?. Handbuch Zum Evangelischen Gesangbuch (in German). Vol. 2. Vandenhoeck & Ruprecht. pp. 70–71. ISBN 3525503237.
- Werner, Wilfried (2016). "'Nicht mitzuhassen, mitzulieben bin ich da!' Exegese und Predigt zu Psalm 137". In Hartlapp, Johannes; Cramer, Andrea (eds.). "Und was ich noch sagen wollte ...": Festschrift für Wolfgang Kabus zum 80. Geburtstag (in German). Frank & Timme. pp. 193–216. ISBN 978-3732903139.
- Williams, Peter (1980). The Organ Music of J.S. Bach, Volume II: BWV 599–771, etc. Cambridge Studies in Music. Cambridge University Press. ISBN 0-521-31700-2.
- Williams, Peter (2003). The Organ Music of J. S. Bach (2nd ed.). Cambridge University Press. ISBN 0-521-89115-9.
- Williams, Peter (2016). Bach: A Musical Biography. Cambridge University Press. ISBN 978-1107139251.
- Winterfeld, Carl von [in German] (1843–1847). Der evangelische Kirchengesang und sein Verhältniss zur Kunst des Tonsatzes (in German). Leipzig: Breitkopf & Härtel.
  - volume I
  - volume II
  - volume III
- Wolff, Christoph (1986). "Johann Adam Reinken and Johann Sebastian Bach: On the Context of Bach's Early Works". In George Stauffer; Ernest May (eds.). J.S. Bach as Organist. Indiana University Press. pp. 57–80. ISBN 0713452625.
- Yearsley, David (2009). "Bach Discoveries". Early Music. 37 (3): 489–492. doi:10.1093/em/cap055.
- Yearsley, David (2012). Bach's Feet: The Organ Pedals in European Culture. Cambridge University Press. pp. 94–97. ISBN 978-1139500111.
- Zahn, Johannes (1891). "7663". Die Melodien der deutschen evangelischen Kirchenlieder (in German). Vol. IV. Gütersloh: Bertelsmann. pp. 508–509.
- Zahn, Johannes (1893). Die Melodien der deutschen evangelischen Kirchenlieder (in German). Gütersloh: Bertelsmann.
  - volume VI
- Zehnder, Jean-Claude (2007-01-15). J. S. Bachs früheste Notenhandschriften [J. S. Bach's earliest autographs] (CD). Edition Bach-Archiv (in German and English). Carus. 83.197/00.
