= Wolfgang Dachstein =

German organist, composer, and lyricist

- Born: 1487; Offenburg
- Died: 7 March 1553 (aged 65–66); Strasbourg
- Era: Renaissance

Wolfgang Dachstein (1487–1553) was a German organist, composer, and lyricist.

He was born in Offenburg. From 1503 Dachstein studied Music and Theology with Martin Luther at Erfurt. He entered the Dominican convent in Strasbourg and in 1521 became the organist at St Thomas' Church, Strasbourg. In early 1523 he left the convent and sided with the Reformation. He married in 1524.

In 1541 Dachstein became the organist at Strasbourg Cathedral and at the same time the music teacher at the Gymnasium there. He obeyed the Augsburg Interim and stayed in his post throughout. He was the first notable organist of the Reformation.

Dachstein used his poetical and musical ability in the service of the Reformation. He was involved in the formulation of the Agenda and provided German Psalms, such as the melodies for the "Teutschen Kirchenampt 1525", an early hymnbook. His paraphrase of Psalm 137, "An Wasserflüssen Babylon" (By the Rivers of Babylon), which appeared both in the "Teutschen Kirchenampt 1525" and in Luther's "Babstschem Gesangbuch" of 1545, is well known. Today the melody is inseparably linked with Paul Gerhardt's text "Ein Lämmlein geht und trägt die Schuld" ("A Little Lamb goes and bears the Guilt", EG 83). Also by Dachstein are the melody for "Im Frieden dein, o Herre mein" ("In Your peace, my Lord", EG 222) and the second melody for Luther's "Aus tiefer Not schrei ich zu dir" ("From deep affliction I cry out to you", EG 299 II). Dachstein's Psalms are also included in Sigmund Hemmel's psalter.

He died in Strasbourg on 7 March 1553.
