= Adelochus =

27th bishop of Strasbourg

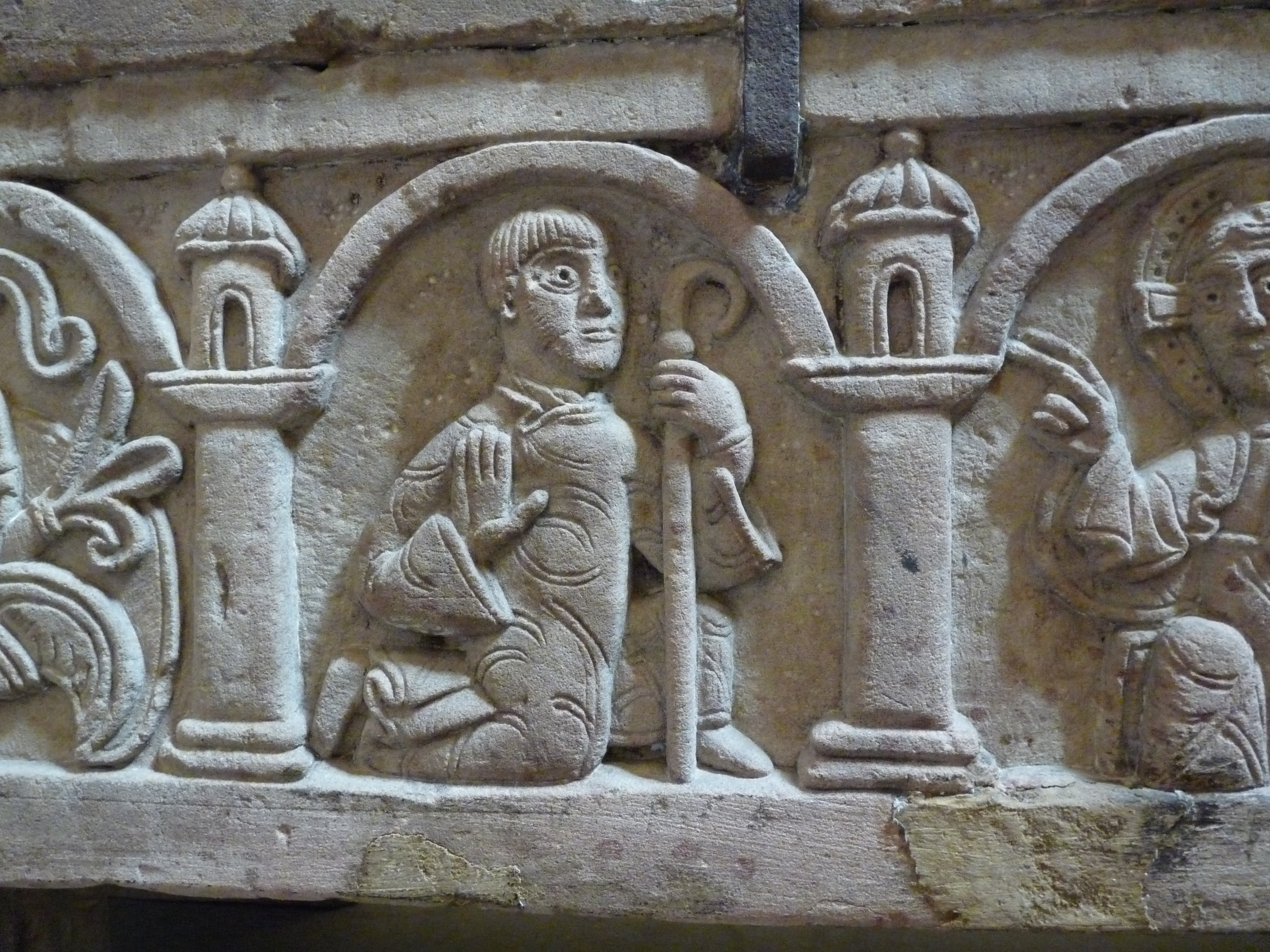
Adeloch, in a detail of his sarcophagus

Adelochus (786–823) or Adeloch was the 27th bishop of Strasbourg, successor of Erlehardus, from 817 to 822. He is buried in a Romanesque carved sarcophagus by the Master of Eschau, supported on couchant lions, and carved with figures in a blind arcade with the Saviour flanked by the kneeling bishop and an angel and in the two outermost panels, a man riding a fish and a man strangling two dragons. formerly in a recess in the quire of St. Thomas, Strasbourg.

He was the preceptor of King Louis the Pious.

A village now gone, situated between the Bruche River and Koenigshoffen, a quartier of Strasbourg, was named Adelshoffen after the bishop in the 9th century.

Another Adelochus was Adelochus (Adelog) von Dorstadt, a Bishop of Hildesheim, 1171–1190.
