= Elias Oechsler =

German composer

Elias Oechsler (né Johann Elias (Note: It exists rarely in this literature source. His name can also be rendered as Öchsler.); 19 March 1850, Spielberg – 15 September 1917, Erlangen) was a German music pedagogue, music director, and composer.

== Biography ==
He initially became a music instructor at the University of Bamberg, then afterwards moved his academic career to the University of Erlangen, becoming the successor of Johann Georg Herzog (Note: His 12 Grössere Choralvorspiele, Op.5 is dedicated to Johann Georg Herzog.) after his predecessor's departure to Munich. Oechsler was close to the Protestant theologian, Friedrich Spitta.
