= Friedrich Spitta =

German Protestant theologian (1852–1924)

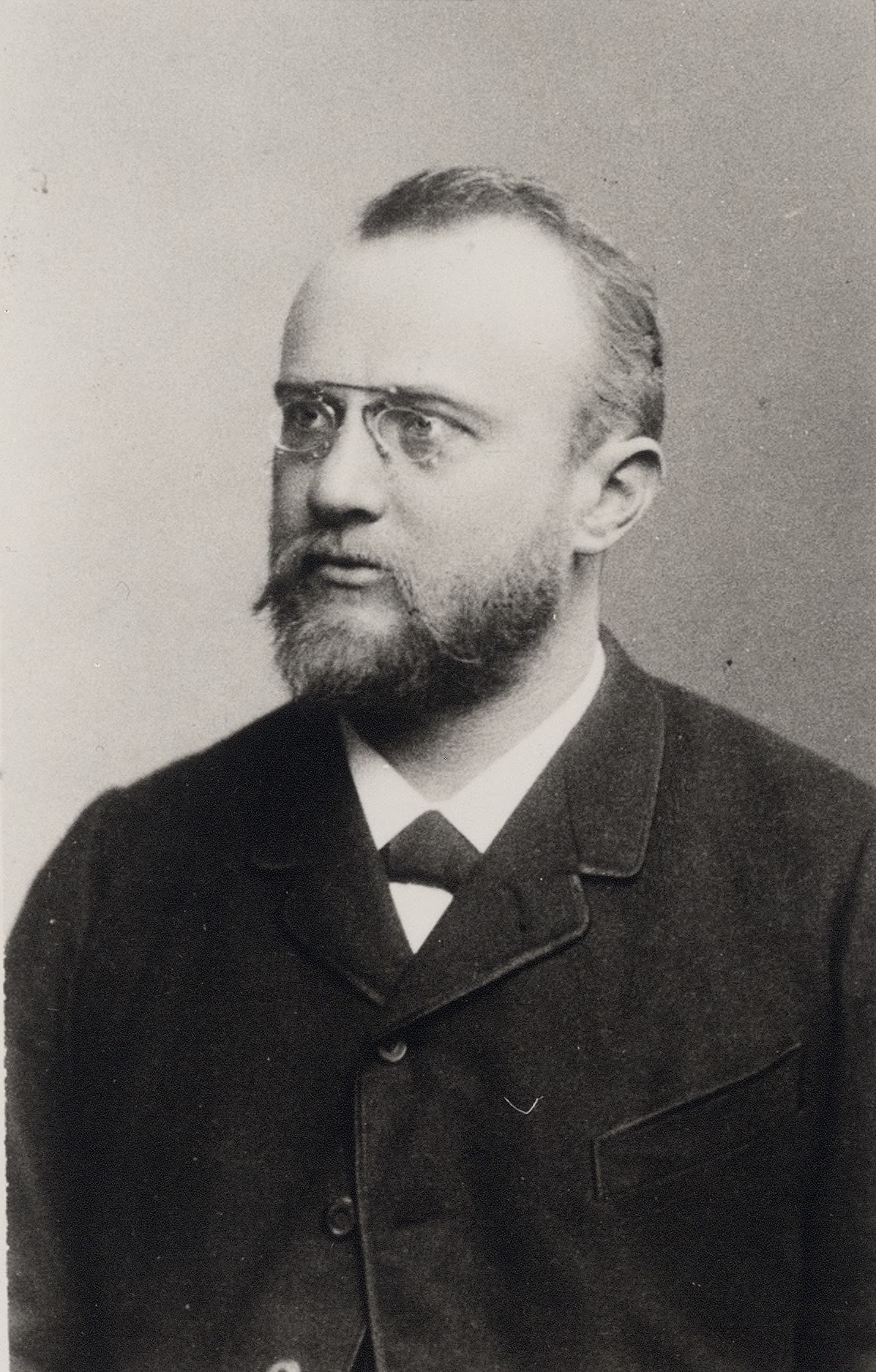
Friedrich Spitta

Friedrich Spitta (11 January 1852 – 7 June 1924) was a German Protestant theologian.

== Biography ==
Spitta was born at Wittingen, Lower Saxony, the son of German hymn writer Karl Johann Philipp Spitta and brother of Philipp (music historian and musicologist best known for his biography of Johann Sebastian Bach). Friedrich studied at the universities of Göttingen and Erlangen, where he was a pupil of Johann Christian Konrad von Hofmann. In the course of time he became (1887) professor ordinarius and university preacher at St. Thomas, Strasbourg. In 1901 he was appointed university rector. In 1919 he was named a professor at the University of Göttingen.

He had a keen interest in church music and the revival of liturgical life in German Protestantism. He was an associate of the composer, Elias Oechsler due to his interests. He revised a communion song from the early Reformation, "Im Frieden dein, o Herre mein". Most of his books dealt with the Apostles and the early Christian church. In 1896 he became joint editor, with Julius Smend, of the Monatschrift für Gottesdienst und kirchliche Kunst.

== Writings ==
Spitta is widely known as the author of a work on the Acts of the Apostles, Die Apostelgeschichte, ihre Quellen and deren geschichtlicher Wert ("Acts of the Apostles, their sources and historical value", 1891). His other works include:

- Der Knabe Jesus, eine biblische Geschichte and ihre apokryphischen Entstellungen (1883).
- Der zweite Brief der Petrus und der Brief der Judas (1885).
- Die Offenbarung des Johannes (1889).
- Zur Reform des evang. Kultus (1891).
- Zur Geschichte und Litteratur des Urchristentums (The history and literature of early Christianity; 3 volumes, 1893–1901) – considered to be his best known work.
- Die synoptische Grundschrift in ihrer Überlieferung durch das Lukasevangelium. (The Synoptic base narrative as preserved in the Gospel of Luke, Untersuchungen zum Neuen Testament, v. 1, Leipzig, 1912).
- Ein Lebensbild Jesu aus den drei ersten Evangelien: Deutsche Übersetzung der synoptischen Grundschrift in ihrer Überlieferung durch das Lukasevangelium (Life of Jesus from the first three Gospels: German translation of the Synoptic base narrative as preserved in the Gospel of Luke, Leipzig: J.C. Hinrichs, 1912).
