= Wolfgang Köpfel =

Strasbourg printer

Wolf[gang] Köpfel (also Köpffel, Köpphel, Cephal[a]eus; fl. 1522–1554) was a Strasbourg printer in the period of the early Reformation. He printed, for instance, works by Martin Luther, which amounted to around a third of his publications, and Matthäus Zell.
