= Gaël Liardon =

Swiss musician (1973–2018)

- Born: December 18, 1973; Lausanne
- Died: October 21, 2018 (aged 44)
- Education: Geneva University of Music
- Occupations: Organist; Composer; Academic
- Organizations: Geneva Conservatory; Schola Cantorum Basiliensis; Festival de Musique Improvisée de Lausanne; Sweelinck Ensemble

Gaël Liardon (18 December 1973 – 21 October 2018) was a Swiss classical keyboard player, composer and academic.

Born in Lausanne, he studied harpsichord, organ and continuo playing with Pierre-Alain Clerc and Jovanka Marville, piano with Freddy Balta, and improvisation with Rudolf Lutz. He has been organist of the church of Villamont, Lausanne, from 1995.

In 2009, he obtained a diploma of teaching theory at the Geneva University of Music, with distinction. He taught music pedagogy at the Geneva Conservatory.

In 1997, he created the Festival de Musique Improvisée de Lausanne and also participated in the creation of the research group on improvisation of the Schola Cantorum Basiliensis.

In 2011, he founded the Sweelinck Ensemble in Geneva.
