= St Thomas' Church, Strasbourg =

Church in Strasbourg, France

Coordinates: 48°34′47″N 7°44′43″E

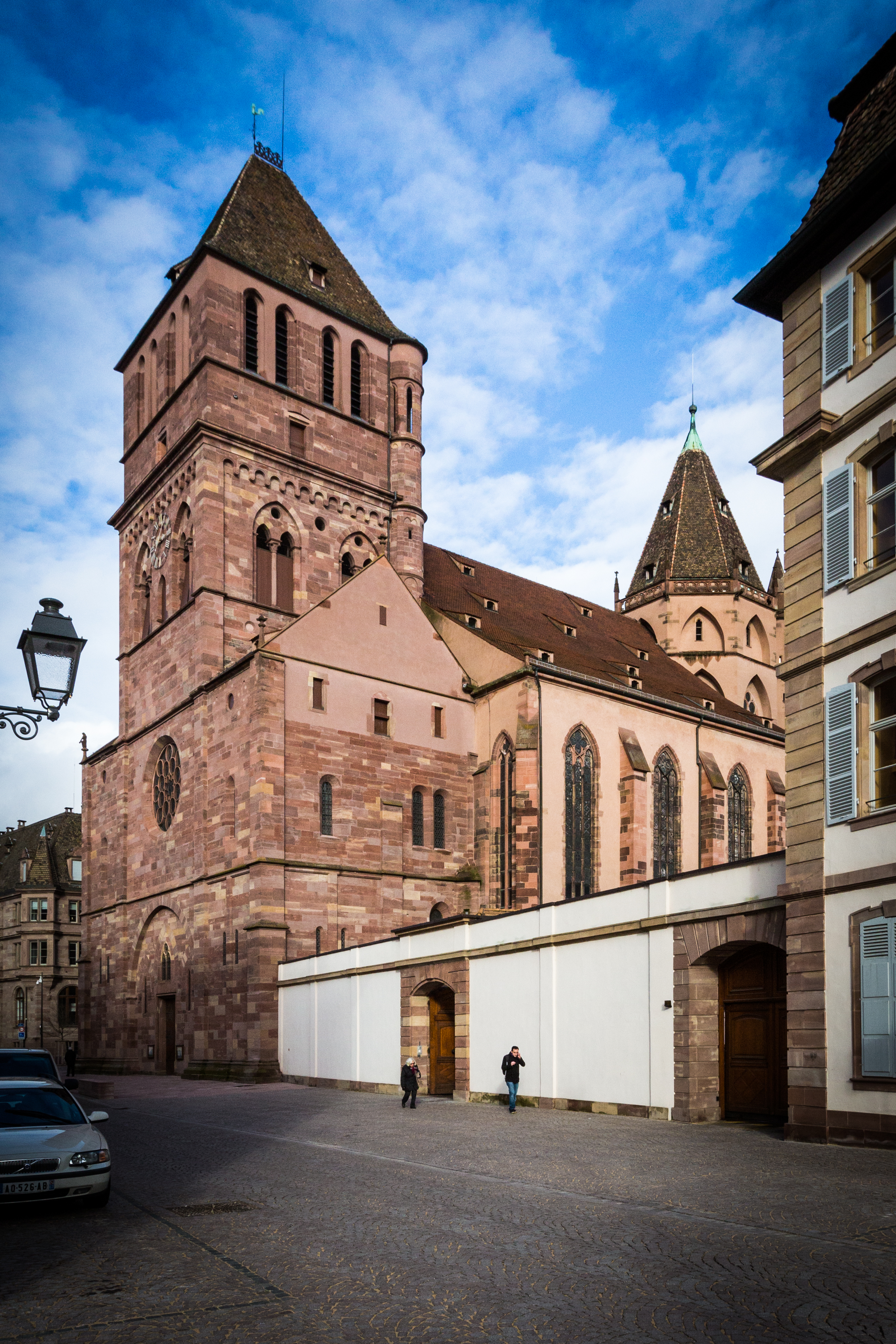
Church front with steeple

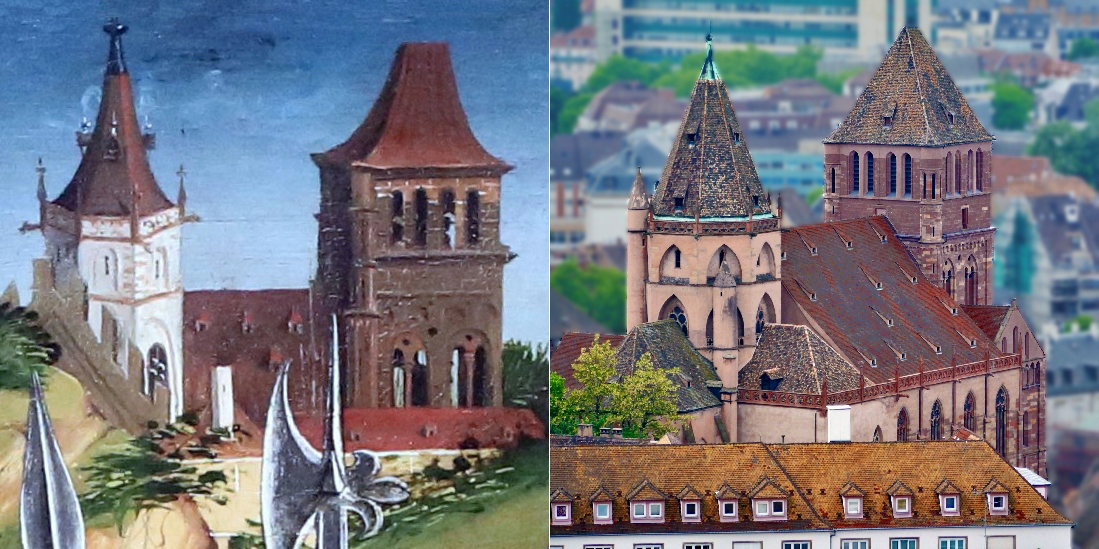
The church seen in 1450 (from a painting by the Master of the Karlsruhe Passion) and in 2015

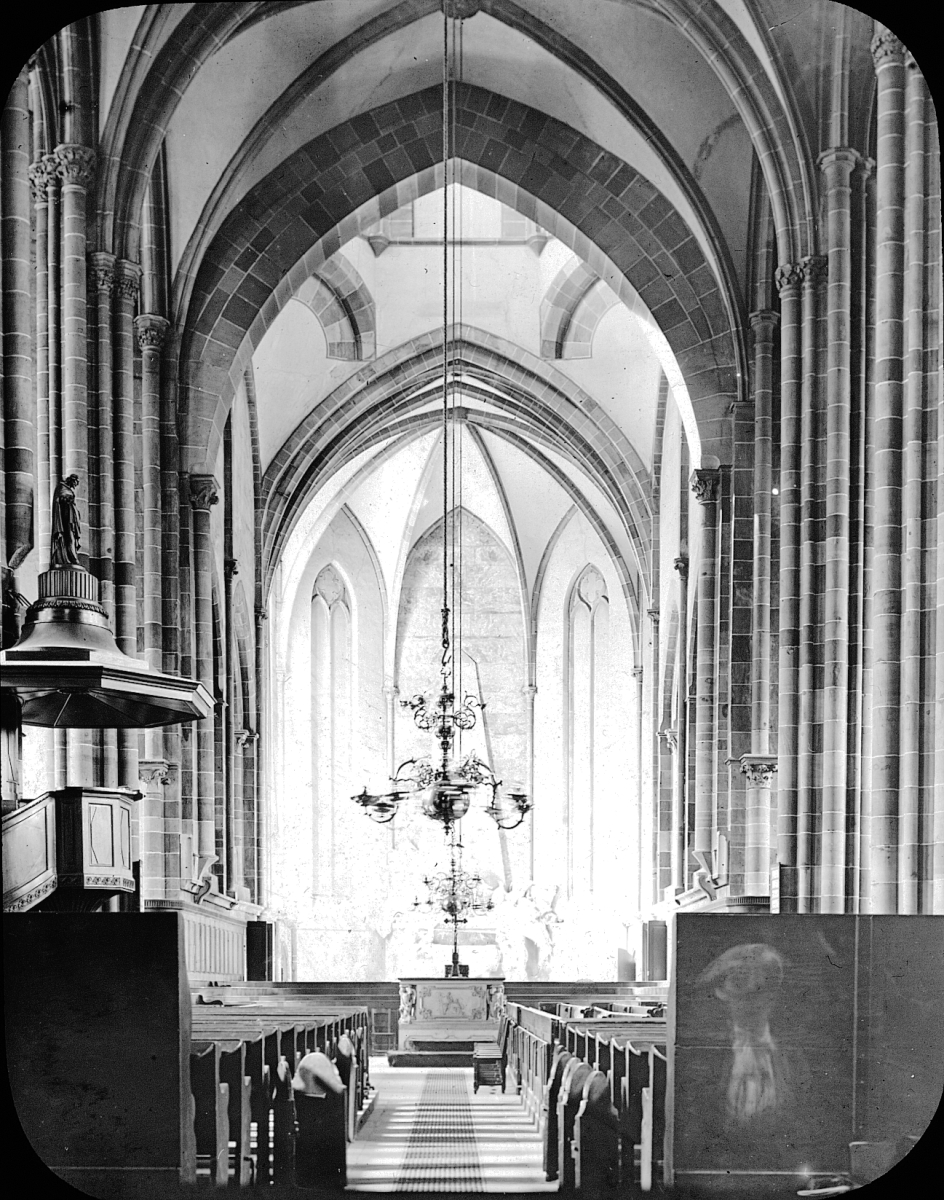
Interior, 1903

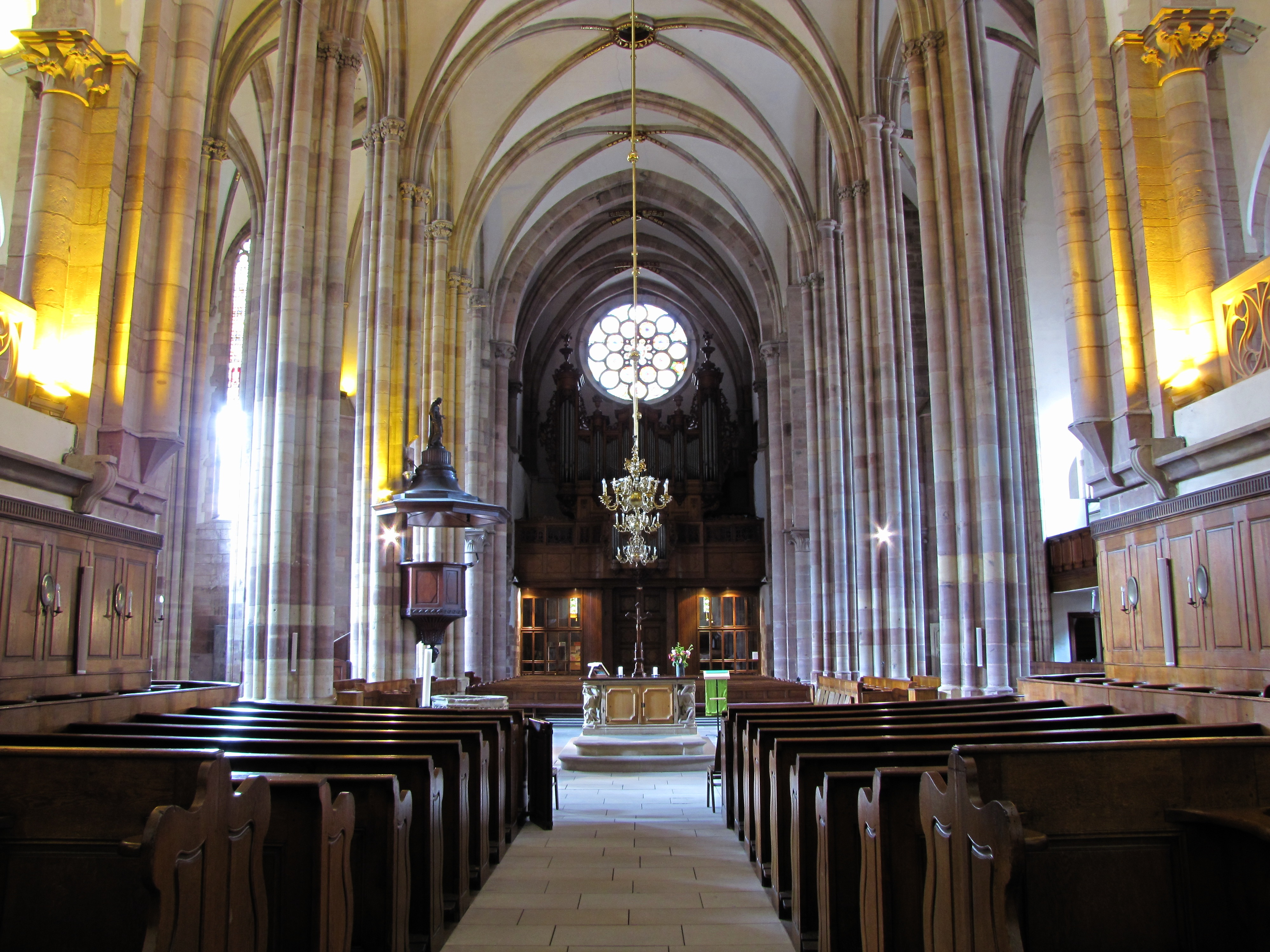
Central nave

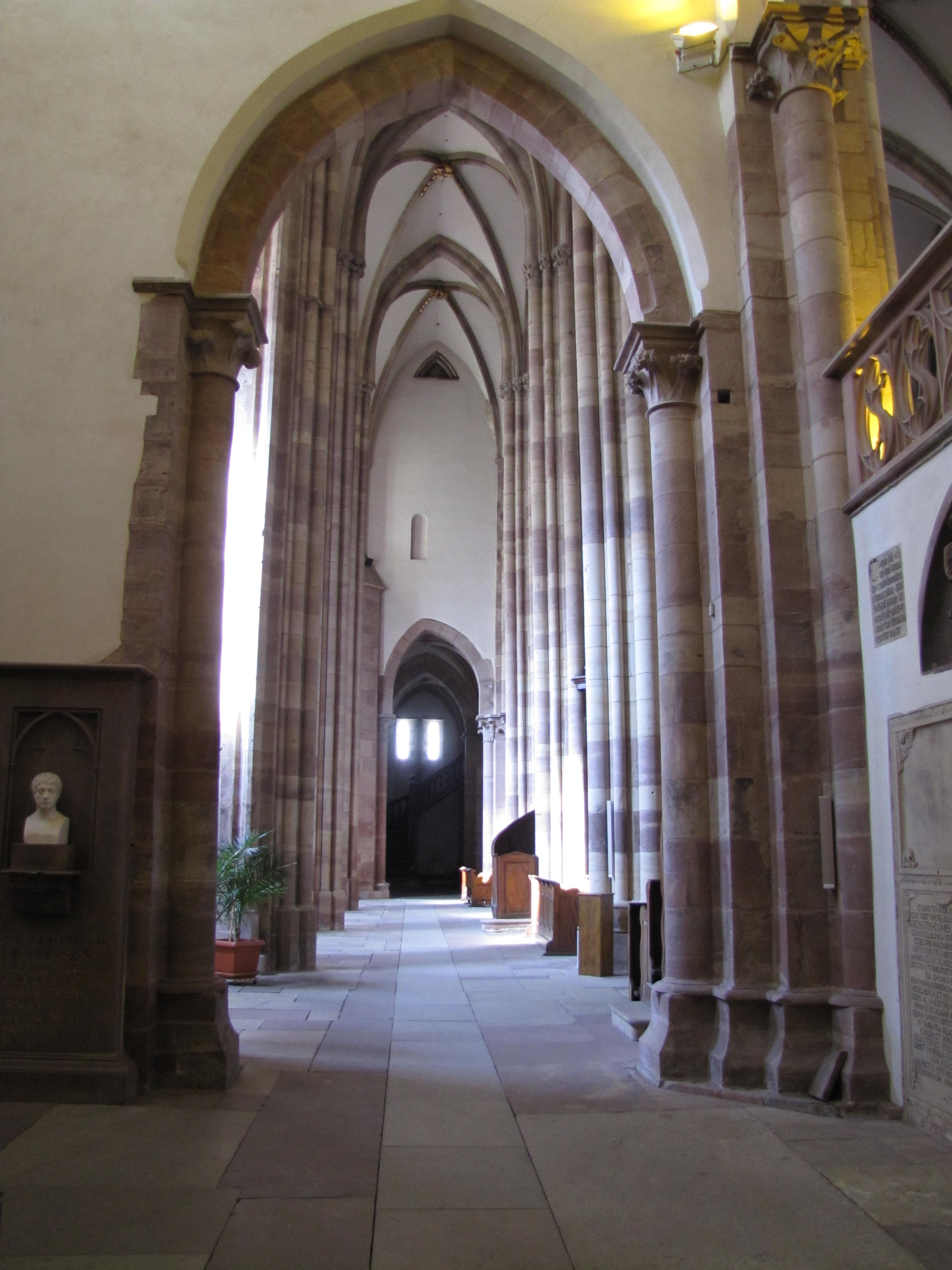
A lateral nave

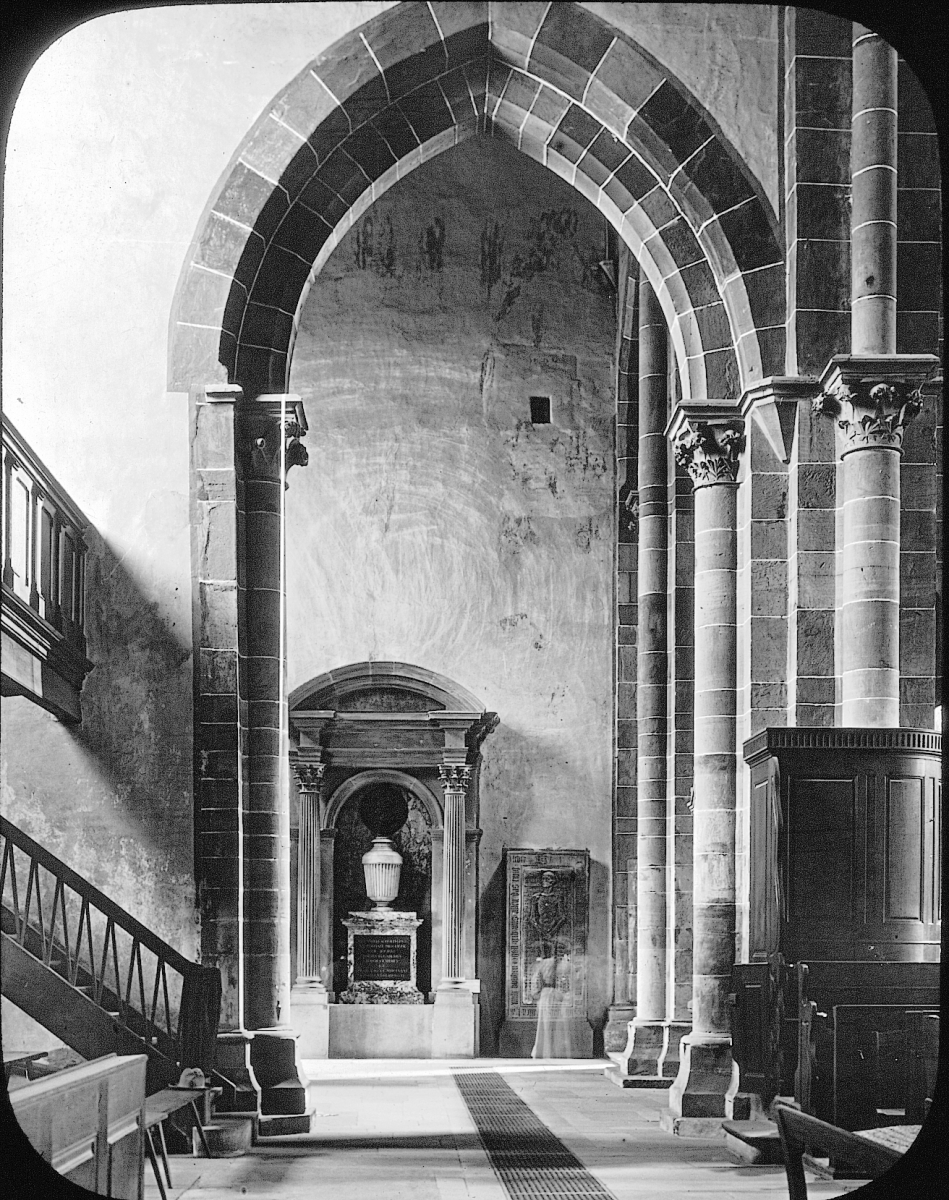
Left aisle widening shown by plumb line,1903

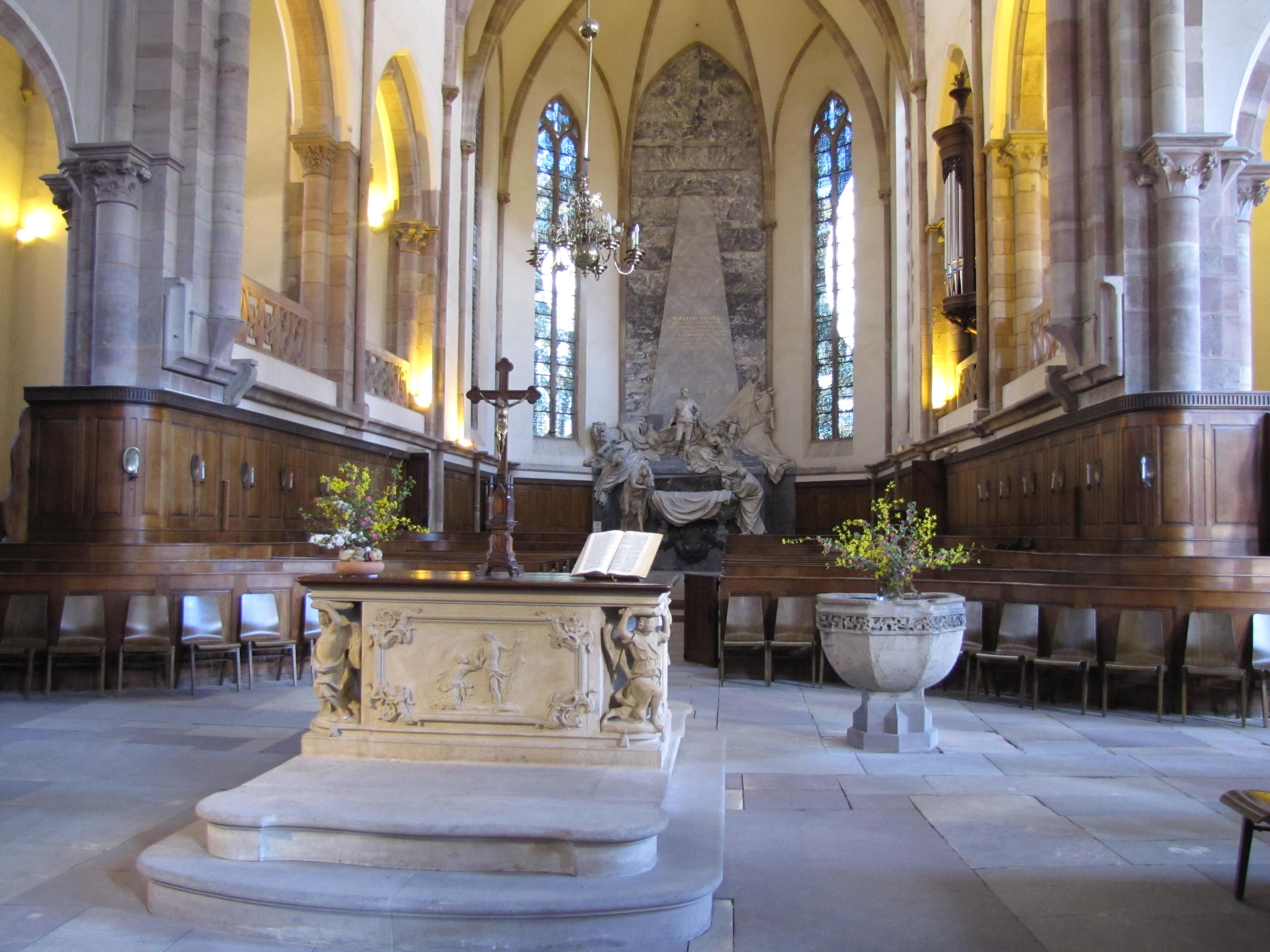
Choir

St Thomas' Church (French: Église Saint-Thomas, German: Thomaskirche) is a historic building in Strasbourg, eastern France. It is the main Lutheran church of the city since its cathedral became Catholic again after the annexation of the town by France in 1681. It is nicknamed the "Protestant Cathedral" (la cathédrale du Protestantisme alsacien, Kathedrale der Protestanten) or the Old Lady (Die alte Dame), and the only example of a hall church in the Alsace region. The building is located on the Route Romane d'Alsace. It is classified as a Monument historique by the French Ministry of Culture since 1862. Its congregation forms part of the Protestant Church of Augsburg Confession of Alsace and Lorraine.

== History ==
The site on which the current church stands was used as a place of worship under the patronage of Thomas the Apostle as early as the sixth century. In the ninth century, Bishop Adelochus established a magnificent church with adjoining school, however both burned down in 1007, and again in 1144. In 1196, construction began on the façade of a new, fortress-like building with an imposing steeple, built in the Romanesque style. Interrupted several times, the building work was completed in 1521, in the style of the late Gothic. Around 1450, the church commissioned a set of oil on panel paintings dedicated to the Passion of Jesus. Most of the surviving panels of this once scattered set are now kept in the Staatliche Kunsthalle in Karlsruhe, which is why the anonymous master who painted them earned the notname of ″Master of the Karlsruhe Passion″. It is assumed that he is identical with the painter Hans Hirtz, recorded in Strasbourg before 1460. The upper right angle of the Christ Carrying the Cross shows the St. Thomas Church as it still looks today.

In 1524, the church, which had been a pillar of local Catholic faith thanks notably to the efforts of the canon and poet Gottfried von Hagenau, converted to the Protestant faith (Martin Bucer served there as a Pastor), a status which it maintained despite annexation of Alsace to the Catholic France. It still administers the primary and secondary schools École Saint-Thomas and Foyer Jean Sturm, as well as the Séminaire Protestant, a seminary located in the adjacent Baroque building.

The church played a crucial part in the liturgical revival as the place where, from 1888, Friedrich Spitta tested new forms of church service, and where the Akademische Kirchenchor (English: Academic Chorus) was brought into being. Julius Smend came to preach regularly from 1893, and between 1894 and 1899, the Gesangbuch für Elsaß-Lothringen (English: Hymn Book for Alsace-Lorraine) was developed there.

On May 7, 2006, the church was the place of the official celebration for the creation of the Union des églises protestantes d'Alsace et de Lorraine (Union of the Protestant Churches of Alsace and Lorraine), or UEPAL.

== Architecture ==
The church is a five-naved hall church, the oldest on the territory of former south-west Germany. Inside it is approximately 65 metres long and 30 metres wide, with a height of 22m (30m under the late-Gothic cupola). There is a gallery on the left outer aisle, and chapels to the left and right of the apse.

== Features ==
=== Organs ===
The church is internationally renowned for its historic and musically-significant organs: the 1741 Silbermann organ, played by Wolfgang Amadeus Mozart in 1778 and faithfully restored in 1979 by Alfred Kern; the French organist Louis Thiry recorded the Art of Fugue by Johann Sebastian Bach on this organ. The other organ is a 1905 organ in the Neo-Baroque style (installed in 1906) built by Fritz Haerpfer, following a design by the organist then, Albert Schweitzer.

=== Tombs ===
Monuments at the church date from between 1130 and 1850. Most famous are the richly decorated sarcophagus of Bishop Adelochus (ca. 1130) by the Master of Eschau and the grand late-Baroque mausoleum of Marshal Maurice de Saxe (1777), created by Jean-Baptiste Pigalle. Among the many other remarkable monuments, the Renaissance tombstone of Nikolaus Roeder von Tiersberg (1510) is notable for its realistic depiction of his decaying corpse. Roeder had been the donor of the life-size Mount of Olives group of sculptures (1498) now to be seen inside Strasbourg Cathedral. Neoclassical sculptor Landolin Ohmacht is represented by two works, one of them dedicated to Jean-Frédéric Oberlin.

=== Frescos ===
A late-Gothic representation of Saint Michael, probably a work by Jost Haller, is, after the Saint Christopher in St. Peter and St. Paul's Church, Wissembourg, the largest of its kind in France.

=== Stained-glass windows ===
Of the medieval leaded windows, only the rose at the front of the church remains intact. In the nave, the upper parts of the windows are lavishly decorated with architectural and botanical motifs. The representations of saints that were originally found below were destroyed in the 16th century by Protestant iconoclasts. The choir windows are of a contemporary style.

== Gallery ==
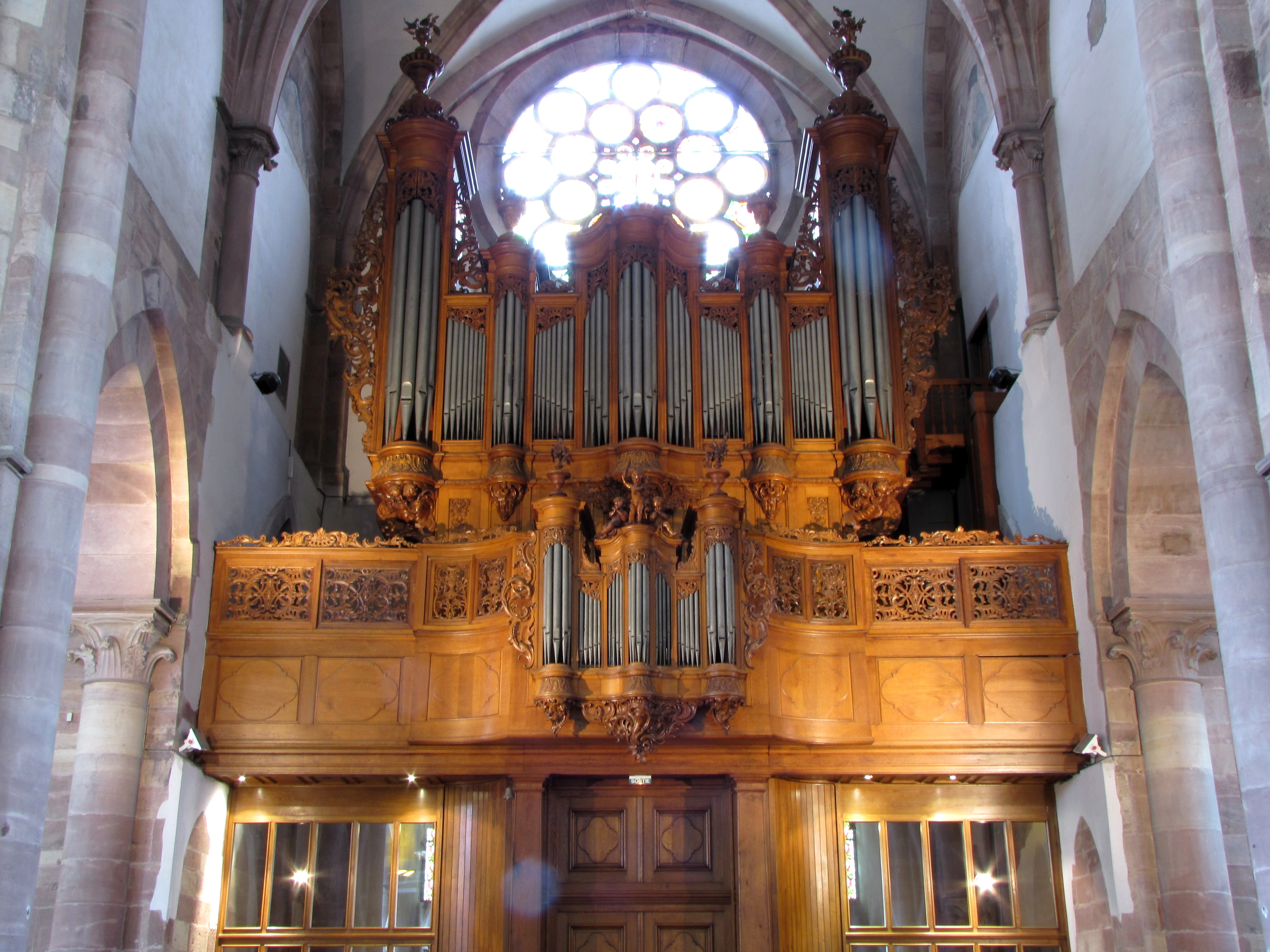
Main organ, by Johann Andreas Silbermann, 1741

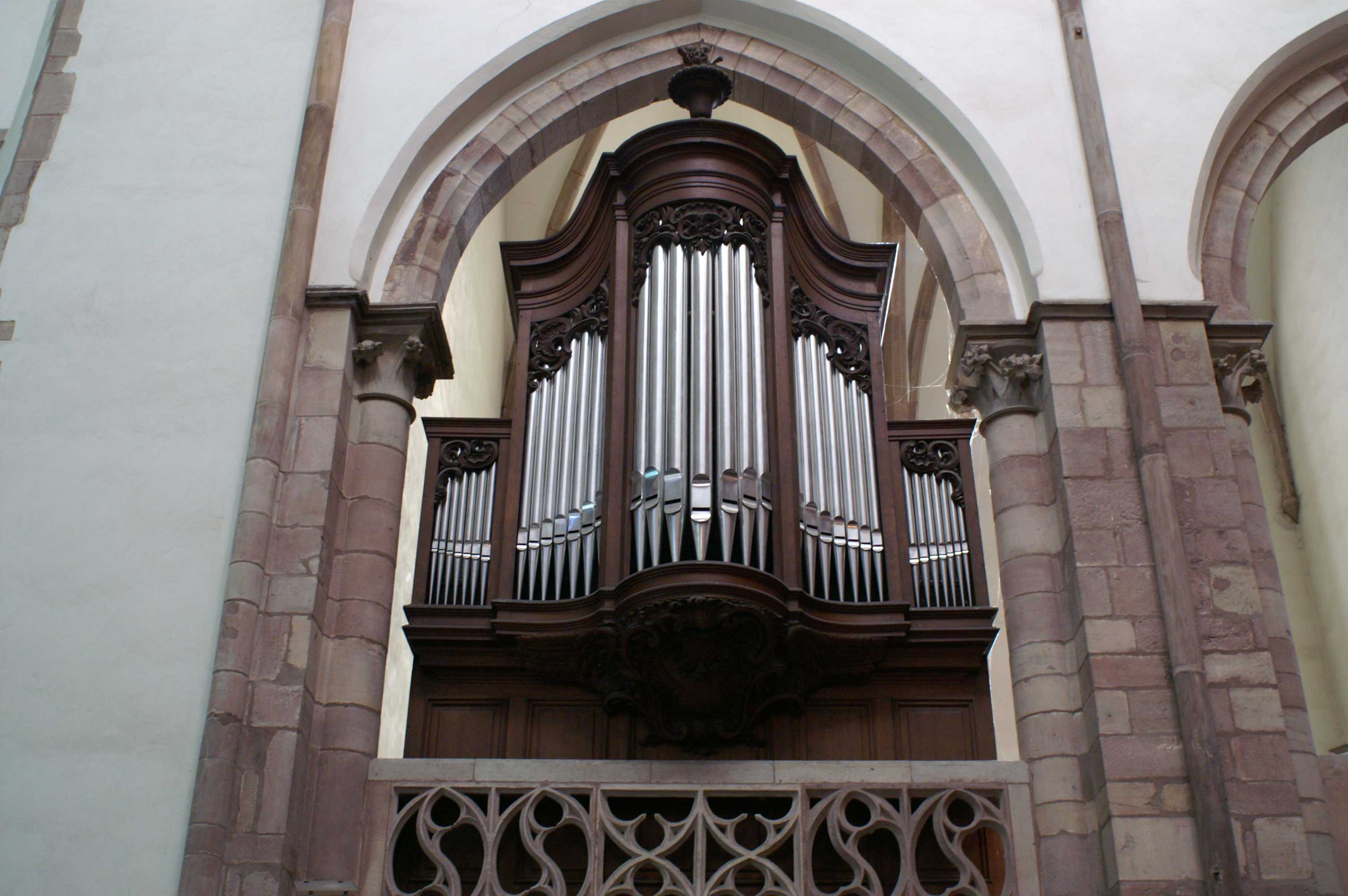
Choir organ built to the plans of Albert Schweitzer, 1905

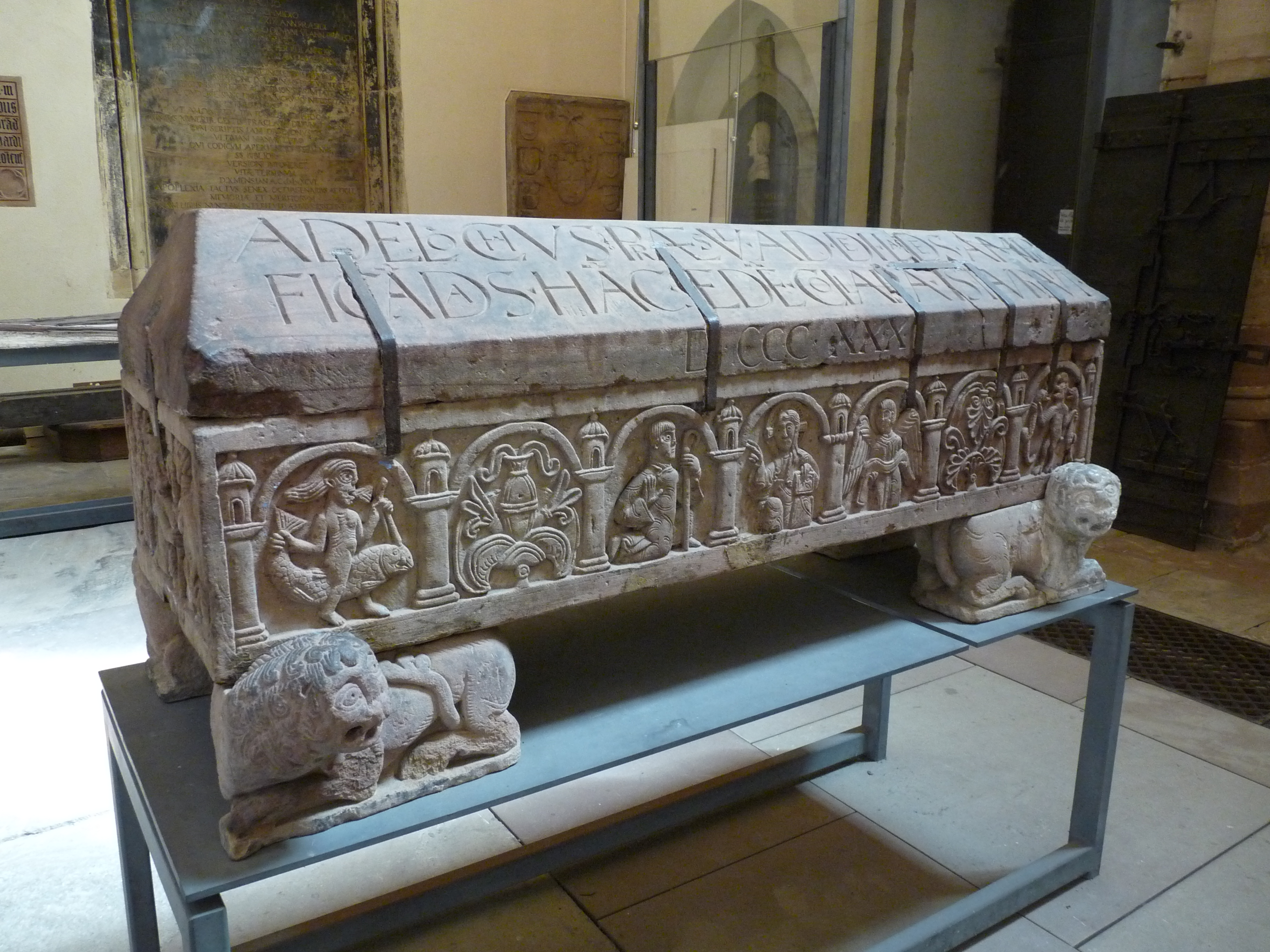
Sarcophagus of bishop Adeloch

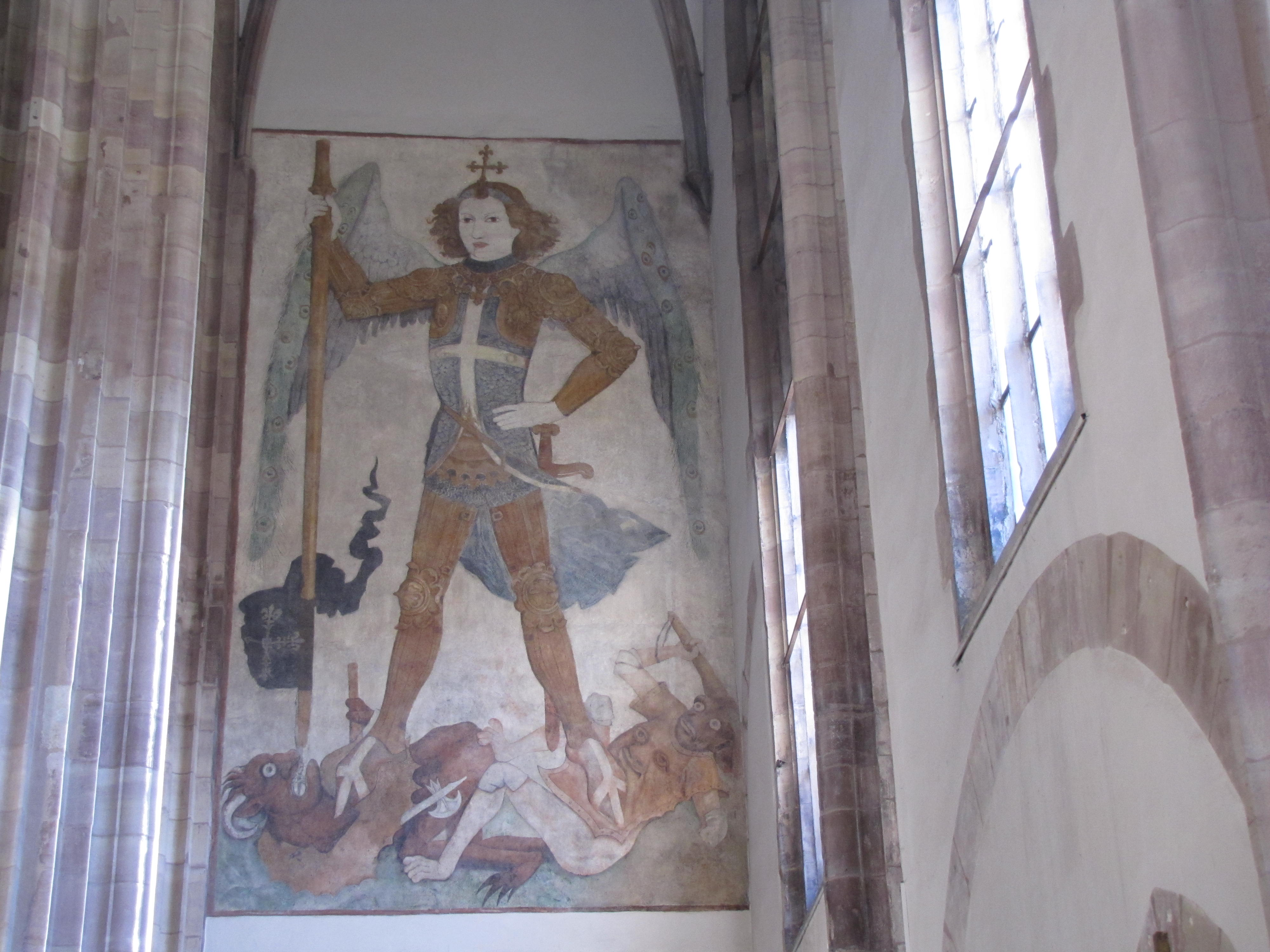
Fresco of Saint Michael

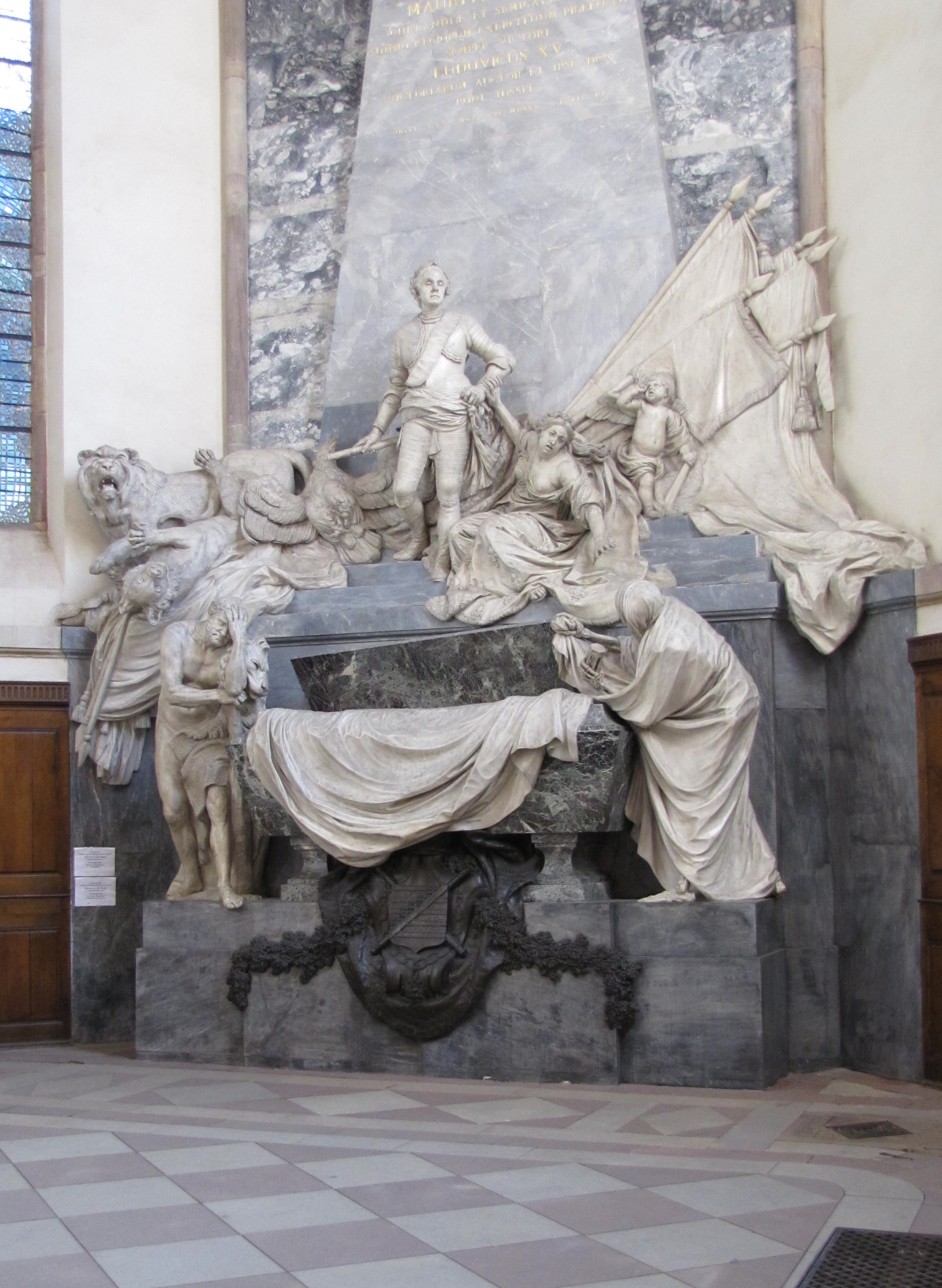
Mausoleum of Marshal Maurice de Saxe by Jean-Baptiste Pigalle
